= Henry Hastings Sibley =

American politician and military leader (1811–1891)

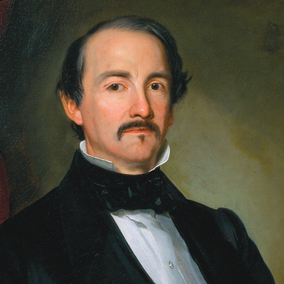
- Sibley's official Governors portrait c.1860 by Thomas Cantwell Healy

1st Governor of Minnesota
- In office May 24, 1858 – January 2, 1860
- Lieutenant: William Holcombe
- Preceded by: Samuel Medary (Minnesota Territory)
- Succeeded by: Alexander Ramsey

Delegate to the U.S. House of Representatives from the Minnesota Territory's at-large district
- In office July 7, 1849 – March 3, 1853
- Preceded by: Constituency established
- Succeeded by: Henry Rice

Delegate to the U.S. House of Representatives from the Wisconsin Territory's at-large district
- In office October 30, 1848 – March 3, 1849
- Preceded by: John H. Tweedy
- Succeeded by: Constituency abolished

Personal details
- Born: February 20, 1811 Detroit, Michigan, U.S.
- Died: February 18, 1891 (aged 79) Saint Paul, Minnesota, U.S.
- Party: Democratic
- Spouse(s): Red Blanket Woman; Sarah Sibley
- Children: At Least 10

Military service
- Allegiance: United States; Union
- Branch/service: United States Army; Union Army
- Years of service: 1862–1866
- Rank: Brigadier General, USV; Brevet Major General, USV
- Commands: District of Minnesota
- Battles/wars: American Civil War; Dakota War of 1862

Henry Hastings Sibley (February 20, 1811 – February 18, 1891) was a fur trader with the American Fur Company, the first Congressional representative for Minnesota Territory, the first governor of the state of Minnesota, and a United States military leader in the Dakota War of 1862 and a subsequent expedition into Dakota Territory in 1863.

Numerous places are named after him, including Sibley County, Minnesota, Sibley, North Dakota, Sibley, Iowa, Hastings, Minnesota, Sibley Memorial Highway, General Sibley Park, and Sibley State Park.

== Early life and education ==
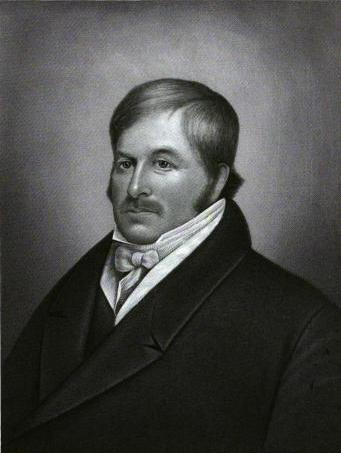
Judge Solomon Sibley, Henry's father

Henry Hastings Sibley was born in Detroit, then part of the Territory of Michigan. His father, Solomon Sibley (1769–1846), was from Sutton, Massachusetts, and a direct descendant of John Sibley, who had immigrated from England to America in 1629. Solomon had moved to Detroit from Marietta, Ohio, in 1798.

Henry's mother, born Sarah Whipple Sproat, was the only daughter of Colonel Ebenezer Sproat, a distinguished officer in the Continental Army, and the granddaughter of Commodore Abraham Whipple of the Continental Navy. Both Sproat and Whipple had received land grants after they lost their fortunes in the American Revolutionary War and were early pioneers in Marietta, Ohio. Sarah was born in Providence, Rhode Island, and attended boarding schools in Bethlehem and Philadelphia, Pennsylvania. She married Solomon Sibley in Marietta in 1802 at the age of twenty, after which she moved to Detroit.

Henry was the fourth of eight children and second son of Solomon and Sarah Sibley. During the War of 1812, when Henry was just 18 months old, Fort Detroit was surrounded by forces led by British Major General Isaac Brock and Shawnee chief Tecumseh. According to the Daughters of the American Revolution, Sarah Sibley and her children had been placed inside the fort for safety with other families, while Solomon was out in the field commanding a company of militia. Mrs. Sibley was found holding baby Henry in her arms "while with her busy hands she was making cartridges for the soldiers," and four officers, including her cousin, were killed by a cannonball in the adjoining room. After American General William Hull surrendered and Detroit was occupied by the British, Solomon Sibley secured permission to leave. The family then left their home with only a few belongings, traveling "by a dim trail through the forests from Detroit to Marietta, camping out most of the way." They returned to Detroit one year later after its recapture by U.S. General William Henry Harrison and his defeat of the British in the Battle of the Thames.

As a boy, Henry Sibley was educated at the Academy of Detroit, after which he was tutored privately in Latin and Greek for two years by Reverend Richard Fish Cadle, an Episcopal clergyman and classics scholar. Around the age of sixteen, Henry started studying law, because Judge Sibley had hoped that his son would follow in his footsteps. After two years, Henry confessed to his father that he found the study of law "irksome" and that he "longed for a more active and stirring life". His parents finally agreed to allow Henry to pursue a career of his own choosing.

== Entry into fur trade ==
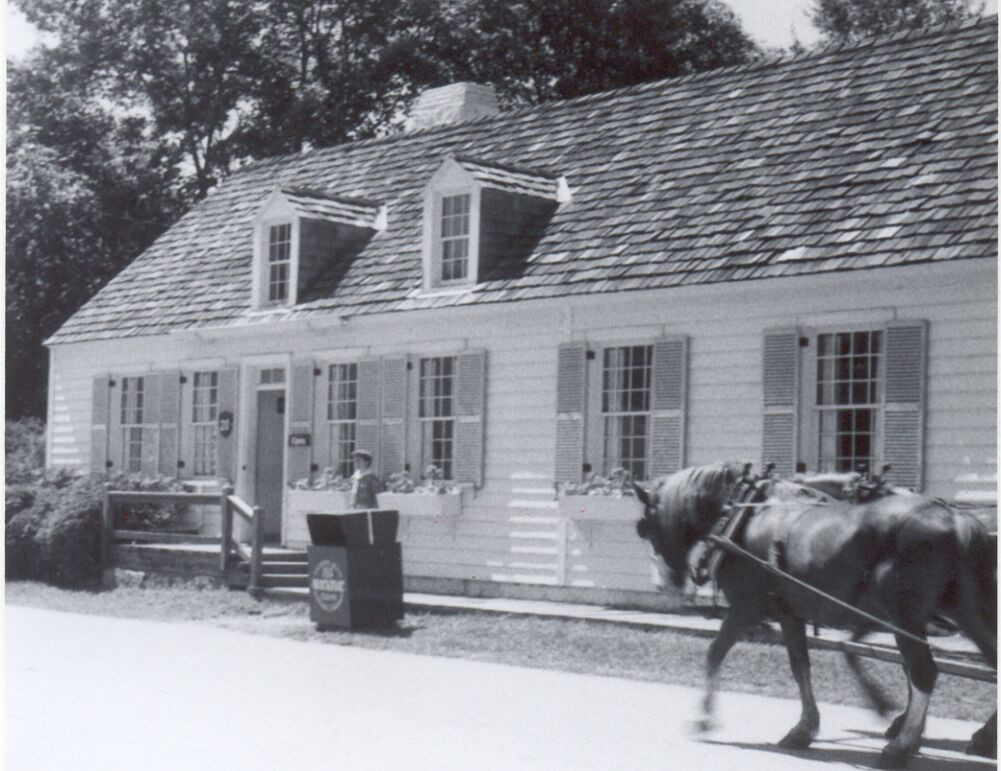
American Fur Company store in Mackinac

On June 20, 1828, at the age of seventeen, Henry H. Sibley left Detroit for Sault Ste. Marie, a prominent fur trading center on both the United States and Canadian sides. His first job was as a clerk working for John Hulbert, whose sutler's store supplied four companies of the U.S. 5th Infantry Regiment, which were garrisoned there. After a few months, he agreed to work as an agent for Susan Johnston, the widow of John Johnston, a Scots-Irish fur trader who had died that year. Mrs. Johnston, also known as Ozhaguscodaywayquay (Woman of the Green Glade), was the daughter of Ojibwe warrior and chief Waubojeeg; mother of three daughters including Native American literary writer Jane Johnston Schoolcraft; and mother-in-law of Henry Schoolcraft, a U.S. Indian agent who later became a well-known ethnologist of Native American tribes in the United States.

In the spring of 1829, Sibley entered into an apprenticeship as a clerk and storekeeper for the American Fur Company (AFC) in Mackinac (then known as Michilimackinac). He returned to Detroit to work at the Bank of Michigan during the winter, and then signed a five-year contract with American Fur Company after working there again in the summer of 1830. In 1832, AFC manager Robert Stuart selected Sibley to transact important business for the company, and sent him on a perilous journey back to Detroit in a bark canoe paddled by nine voyageurs. Despite a severe storm, damage to the canoe, and news of a cholera outbreak in Detroit which killed his grandmother, Sibley successfully completed the journey and secured several licenses for the American Fur Company from Michigan Territorial Governor George Bryan Porter. From 1832 to 1833 and again from 1833 to 1834, Sibley was charged with the responsibility of buying supplies for the company via its offices in Cleveland, which required him to canvass rural Ohio and Pennsylvania on horseback in winter.

In 1834, as American Fur Company founder John Jacob Astor prepared to retire, the company was in the midst of reorganization as a partnership, with Astor's chief lieutenant Ramsay Crooks as president and senior partner. Sibley approached Crooks directly and asked to be released from his employment contract with Astor, which ran until 1835, one year early. He explained that his parents "were strongly opposed to [his] longer sojourn in what was little better than a wild Indian country," and that he had been offered much better paying positions as a cashier at two banks, including one in Detroit. However, Crooks rejected Sibley's offer to pay US$1,000 to be released from his contract. Instead, his counteroffer was to include Sibley as a junior partner in the American Fur Company's newly constituted Western Outfit, together with Jean Joseph Rolette and Hercules L. Dousman, who had been running the company's Upper Mississippi Outfit. Sibley would be the regional manager for fur trade with the Dakota north and west of Lake Pepin, based at the mouth of the Minnesota River (then called St. Peter's). Sibley later wrote that he was finally persuaded by Dousman's glowing description of the Minnesota Valley as a hunter's paradise where "woods abounded with bear, deer and other game animals, and the numerous lakes with aquatic fowl of every variety."

== Fur trade in Minnesota country ==
In October 1834, 23-year-old Henry Sibley left Mackinac, traveling to Green Bay and up the Fox River, then to the Wisconsin River via a two-mile portage trail. On the Wisconsin River, he found a tiny stern-wheel steamboat which took him to Prairie du Chien. After spending several days at the American Fur Company's Western Outfit headquarters at Prairie du Chien, Sibley traveled the remaining 300 miles of wilderness by horseback. According to his letter to company president Ramsay Crooks dated November 1, Sibley finally arrived in St. Peters (now known as Mendota, Minnesota) on October 28, 1834. During his journey to St. Peters, Sibley was accompanied by Alexis Bailly, whose four trading posts Sibley would take over as head of the company's "Sioux Outfit" the following year. They spent six months together, during which Bailly warned Sibley that "the American Fur Company squeezed its small traders dry then dropped them like useless rinds."

=== American Fur Company "Sioux Outfit" ===
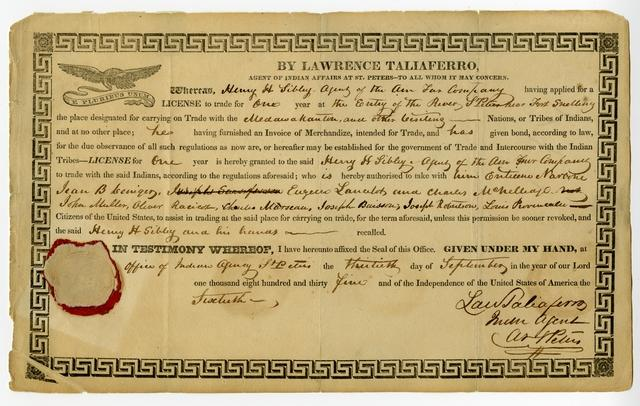
Trading license granted to Henry H. Sibley of the American Fur Company by Indian Agent Lawrence Taliaferro, September 30, 1835

Henry Sibley officially took over as head of the American Fur Company's Sioux Outfit in 1835 at the age of 24. The Sioux Outfit was headquartered at St. Peters (now Mendota). The main store in St. Peters served five nearby Mdewakanton Dakota villages, the "mixed-blood" community around Fort Snelling, and groups of Dakota coming from the Cannon and Cedar River valleys to the southwest. Sibley also managed three distant posts at Traverse des Sioux, Lake Traverse, and a third location serving the Sisseton Dakota between the headwaters of the Des Moines and Big Sioux Rivers; these posts were staffed by hired clerks. In addition, the Sioux Outfit had two independent subsidiary traders, including Jean-Baptiste Faribault, Alexis Bailly's father-in-law, who ran a post at Little Rapids (near present-day Chaska), and Joseph Renville, who ran a trading post at Lac qui Parle on the Upper Minnesota River.

Sibley had arrived in the fur traders' "frontier" with a sense of adventure, hoping to earn a quick fortune before triumphantly returning to "civilization". Unfortunately for Sibley, as Bailly had warned, it had already become difficult for traders to turn a profit through the traditional fur trade. Nevertheless, Sibley worked diligently to try to maximize profits, and according to American Fur Company records, the fur trade in Minnesota "was in its most flourishing condition" in the years leading up to 1837.

Whereas fur traders such as Joseph Renville and Hazen Mooers had traditionally rewarded loyal Dakota hunters with generous gift-giving and access to credit, Sibley "sought to transform the fur trade into a completely modern business." He instructed the traders and clerks in his territory to limit credits to powder, lead and shot. Many Dakota hunters complained to Indian agent Lawrence Taliaferro about these changes. Hunters from Shakopee's band reported that ever since Sibley had taken over, "they could get 'nothing' from their traders, 'not even a flint much less traps & ammunition.'"

Sibley removed Hazen Mooers, a fur trader who was popular with Sisseton, Wahpeton and Yankton hunters, from his trading post at Lake Traverse which he had run for over 20 years. By the fall of 1835, Sibley and Jean Joseph Rolette had replaced Mooers with Joseph R. Brown, a fur trader who had previously quarreled with Agent Taliaferro for hauling whiskey and owed money to Rolette and the Western Outfit. Sibley was also reportedly concerned about the power and influence of mixed-blood trader Joseph Renville, who had his own stockade and soldiers' lodge at Lac qui Parle, and asked Brown to keep an eye on him.

The steady decline in the wild animal population in the region meant that more and more hunters were competing for scarcer game, and driving herds further north. By 1836, the Sisseton and Wahpeton Dakota had become more protective of their hunting zones, even refusing access to the Mdewakanton Dakota, who had been hardest hit and now depended entirely on the western hunting grounds. Sibley, whose business relied heavily on collecting furs from the Mdewakantons, made an emergency trip to Traverse des Sioux to broker a solution. He threatened to withdraw all American Fur Company men if the Sissetons and Wahpetons did not allow the Mdewakantons to hunt there.

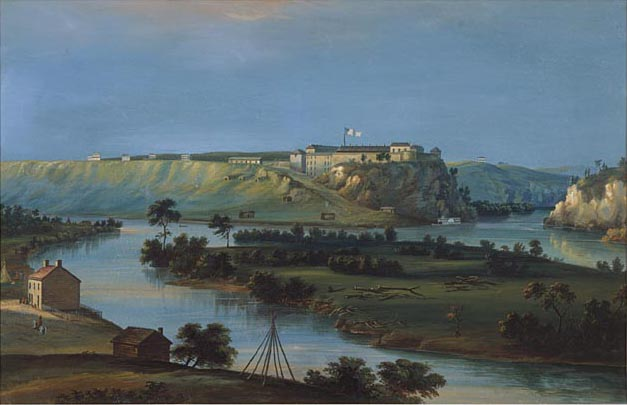
Fort Snelling (1844)

=== Government contracts ===
Sibley worked to secure government contracts for the American Fur Company, in part to eliminate potential competition. From 1836 to 1839, Sibley was in charge of operating the army sutler's store at Fort Snelling, in partnership with Pennsylvania newspaper editor and former Indian agent Samuel C. Stambaugh, who had been appointed to the post but had no interest in moving there. By controlling the army sutler's store, the fur traders were confident that they could maintain their local monopoly; otherwise, there would be nothing to stop the Dakota from patronizing the sutler's store at Fort Snelling and using fur pelts to pay for goods. Any losses incurred by the traders would be more than offset by the higher prices they could charge the Dakota. However, the sutler's store proved to be a headache for Henry Sibley, who did not get along with Stambaugh. Business was also highly dependent on the number of troops garrisoned at Fort Snelling. By 1837, the garrison was drastically reduced due to the Second Seminole War in Florida Territory, and many soldiers in the First Infantry Regiment left the fort with unpaid credits.

In 1835, Sibley started lobbying for the establishment of a post office at Fort Snelling with regular service from Prairie du Chien, contacting his political connections in Michigan Territory for support. He succeeded, and the American Fur Company's Western Outfit secured the contract for mail delivery from 1837 to 1839. Mail was carried by steamboats during the summer, but during the long winter, Sibley and his partners had to hire runners, and found it difficult to deliver the mail on time.

=== Land cession treaties of 1837 ===
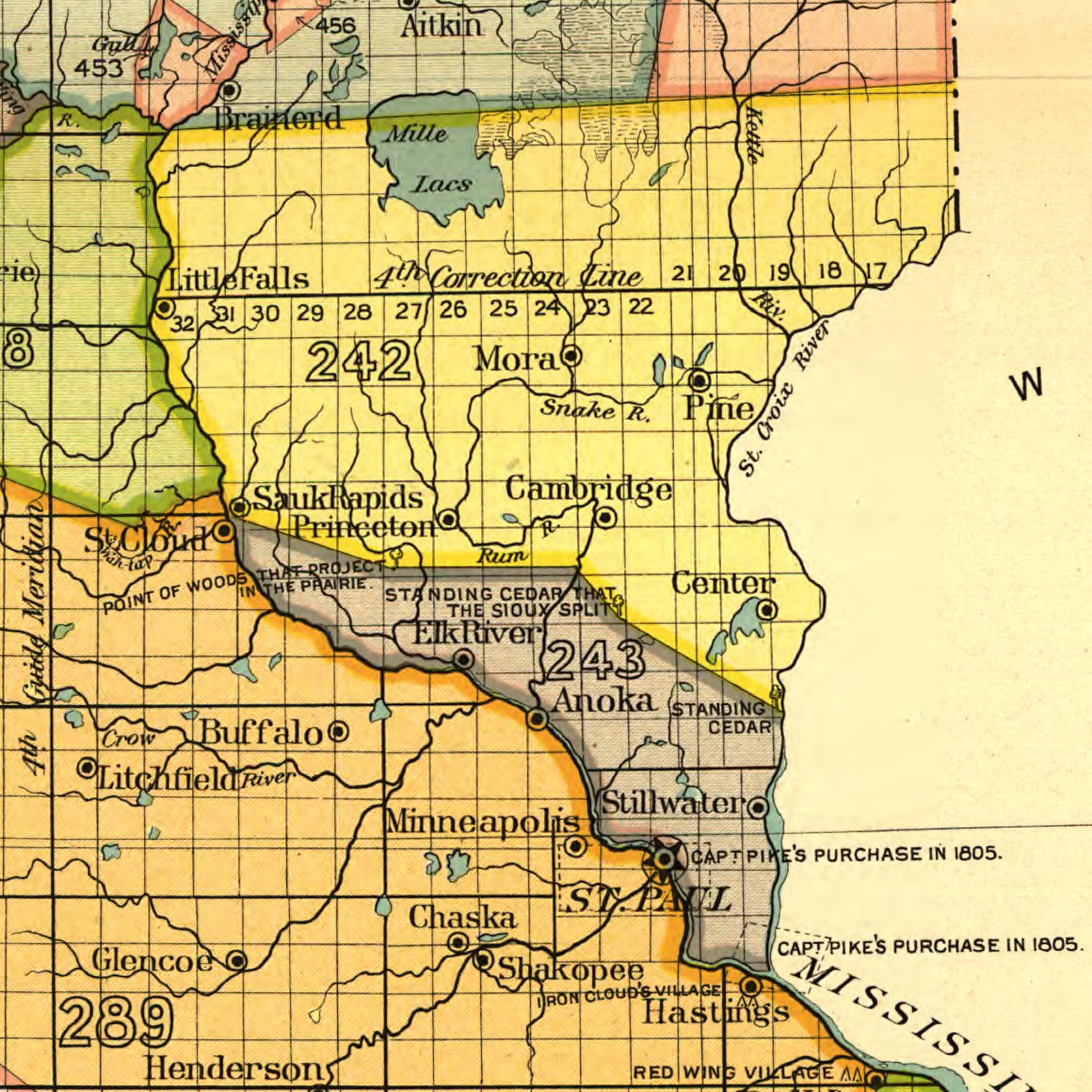
Land ceded to the U.S. by the Ojibwe (242) and Dakota (243) in 1837 treaties (now part of Minnesota)

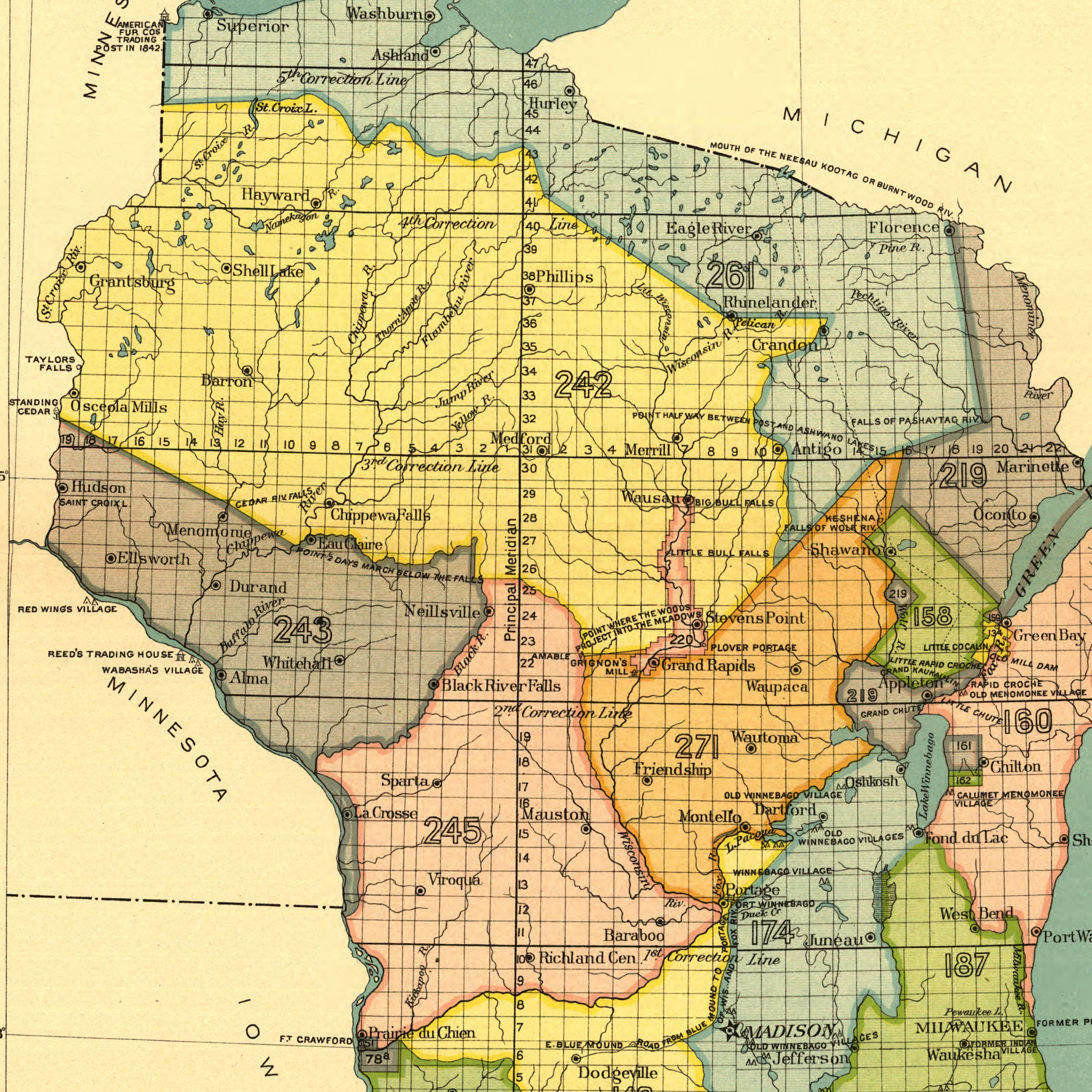
Land ceded to the U.S. by the Ojibwe (242), Dakota (243) and Winnebago (245) in 1837 treaties (now part of Wisconsin)

The financial panic of 1837 nearly resulted in a collapse of the U.S. banking and monetary system, triggering an economic depression which lasted until the mid-1840s. Fur prices fell sharply and muskrat pelts, which made up the bulk of the fur trade in Sibley's region, were no longer in demand. By February 1838, Crooks reported to Sibley that the previous year's pelts were still sitting in a New York warehouse, and had become essentially worthless. The partners of the American Fur Company were on the brink of financial ruin.

However, in the summer and fall of 1837, the United States government signed three major treaties with the Ojibwe, Dakota and Winnebago tribes, in which they agreed to give up all their lands east of the Mississippi River in return for compensation. Sibley and the American Fur Company partners aimed to collect payment from the government to cover a substantial portion of their business losses, which appeared on their books as "Indian debts". In December 1836, Sibley had written to American Fur Company president Ramsay Crooks urging him to lobby his Washington connections to prevent Indian agent Lawrence Taliaferro, a long-time political enemy of the traders, from being appointed as treaty commissioner the following year. Taliaferro nevertheless prevailed.

On July 29, 1837, Henry Sibley was a signatory to the U.S. treaty with the Ojibwe, also known as the Treaty of St. Peters, the Treaty with the Chippewa, or the "White Pine Treaty". The Ojibwe treaty named his business partner Hercules L. Dousman as one of three fur traders to receive debt payments.

Agent Taliaferro, infuriated by what he viewed as trader meddling when the Ojibwe treaty was signed at Fort Snelling, moved the Mdewakanton Dakota treaty negotiations to Washington, D.C. On August 18, Taliaferro managed to leave the St. Peter's Indian Agency with twenty-six Mdewakanton chiefs and headmen on a steamboat without tipping off the traders and without telling the chiefs the real reason for the trip. Soon after their departure, however, Taliaferro's covert operation was discovered, and nearly a dozen traders, including Henry Sibley and Joseph R. Brown, arrived in Washington close behind them. It was Sibley's first time in Washington. In early September, Hercules Dousman wrote to Sibley, instructing him "leave no stone unturned to get something handsome for us" when the U.S. government was negotiating with the Dakota. However, Taliaferro prevented most of the American Fur Company traders from entering the room where discussions took place between Secretary of War Joel Roberts Poinsett, Commissioner Carey A. Harris, and the Mdewakanton chiefs, starting September 21. Only "mixed-blood" American Fur employee Alexander Faribault and former AFC trader Alexis Bailly were allowed in the meetings as staff assistants who could also serve as interpreters.

On September 29, 1837, twenty-one Mdewakanton leaders and representatives of the U.S. government signed the "Treaty with the Sioux". The Mdewakanton gave up "all their land, east of the Mississippi river, and all their islands in the said river" to the United States for $16,000 in cash and goods up front, plus an annual distribution worth up to $40,000 per year. Meanwhile, mixed-blood "relatives and friends" would receive $110,000 up front (because they were ineligible for annuities), and $90,000 would be paid to the traders to settle Mdewakanton debts – a little more than one-third of the debts they had claimed. Sibley wrote to Ramsay Crooks that the whole treaty was "but one series of iniquity and wrong", which had left Faribault and Bailly "so exasperated, that they seriously considered traveling home without the delegation... This is the boasted paternal regard for the poor Indian. 'O Shame where is thy blush!" Historian Gary Clayton Anderson writes that "Self-interest on their part underlay this opposition: the traders wanted the government to spend more money." Sibley was also irritated that the treaty named Taliaferro's interpreter, Scott Campbell, as an annuity recipient with title to part of the land then occupied by Sibley's trading establishment — a personal concession which was later struck out by the United States Congress.

On November 1, 1837, Henry Sibley was a signatory to the Treaty with the Winnebago, also negotiated in Washington. The treaty was potentially the most lucrative for the American Fur Company, with $200,000 set aside for individual compensation and settlement of "debts of the nation" to traders. The traders were "jubilant" over the terms of the treaty, and Sibley wrote to his father saying that once his debts were paid, he hoped to end his relationship with American Fur and return to Detroit the following year.

=== Aftermath of 1837 treaties ===
It took many months for the treaties to be ratified by the U.S. Congress, which was reluctant to approve the treaty expenditures in the midst of an economic depression. Special commissioners were appointed to examine the books of each claimant and allocate funds. Disputes also arose among American Fur Company traders, complicated by the fact that some debts had been incurred before the company reorganized in 1834.

Even before the treaties were ratified, however, the area around the Upper Mississippi and St. Croix Rivers changed quickly. Hundreds of timber speculators and squatters began moving into the area, also on land that still belonged to the Dakota, causing Chief Big Thunder Little Crow to complain to Agent Taliaferro that the influx of squatters seemed "hasty" and premature. Meanwhile, many Mdewakanton, convinced that the promised payments and provisions would soon arrive, refused to join the winter hunt and insisted that all past debts to traders had been settled by the treaty. In December 1837, Hercules Dousman complained to Henry Sibley that the Mdewakanton "say it is not necessary to work for the traders anymore as they will now have plenty to live on independent of the traders' goods." Tensions in the region grew to unprecedented levels as the funds and supplies failed to arrive, and many eastern Ojibwe and Dakota faced near starvation. In April 1838, couriers from Lake Traverse informed Sibley that angry Sisseton and Wahpeton had assaulted several American Fur Company traders, killing Louis Provencalle Jr., wounding Joseph R. Brown, and killing and stealing horses and oxen. Sibley retaliated immediately by closing all trading posts west of Fort Renville on Lac qui Parle.

The treaties were finally ratified in June 1838, but it would take many more months before payments reached the traders and the Native American tribes. Hearings on the Winnebago claims in particular dragged on through 1839, mired in public scandal and charges of corruption. In November 1839, the Western Outfit partners including Henry Sibley agreed with Ramsay Crooks to extend their original contract with American Fur Company for another year, until August 1, 1841.

On August 1, 1842, the American Fur Company sold its interest in the Western Outfit to Pierre Chouteau Jr. and Company. The American Fur Company declared bankruptcy on September 10, 1842. Independent of American Fur, Sibley was subject to fewer restrictions and was able to trade freely with both the Ojibwe and the Dakota.

== Marriage and family ==
When Henry Sibley first arrived in St. Peters (in present-day Mendota, Minnesota) on October 28, 1834, he was "struck with the picturesque beauty of the scene" looking out at Fort Snelling perched high above the junction of the Minnesota and Mississippi Rivers. However, as he descended the hill, he was "disappointed to find only a group of log huts" occupied by the fur traders and staff, and included an urgent request for new buildings in his first letter to Ramsay Crooks on November 1. Sibley stayed at the largest log house, which belonged to Alexis Bailly, whose business Sibley took over the following year.

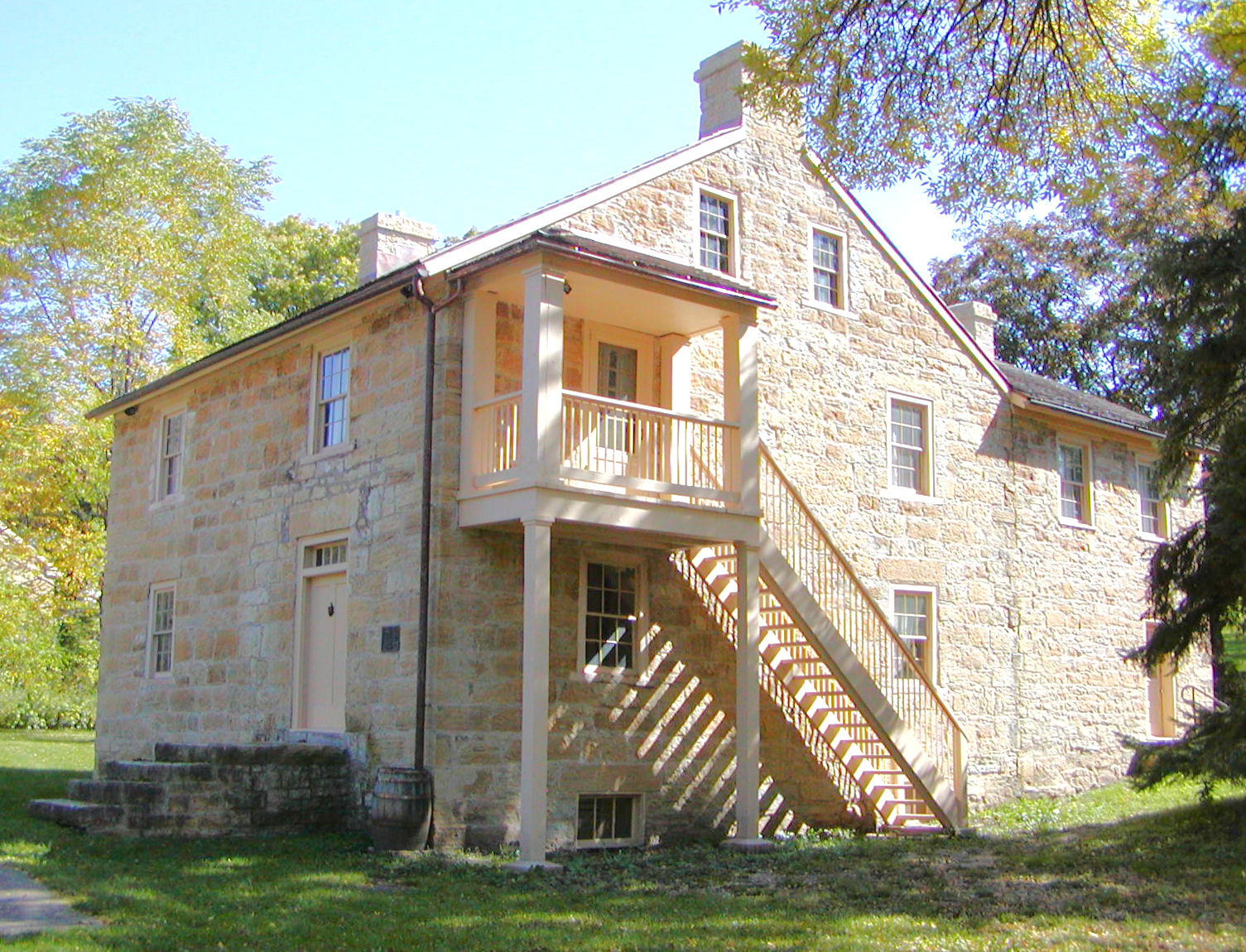
The Sibley House, now part of the Sibley House Historic Site

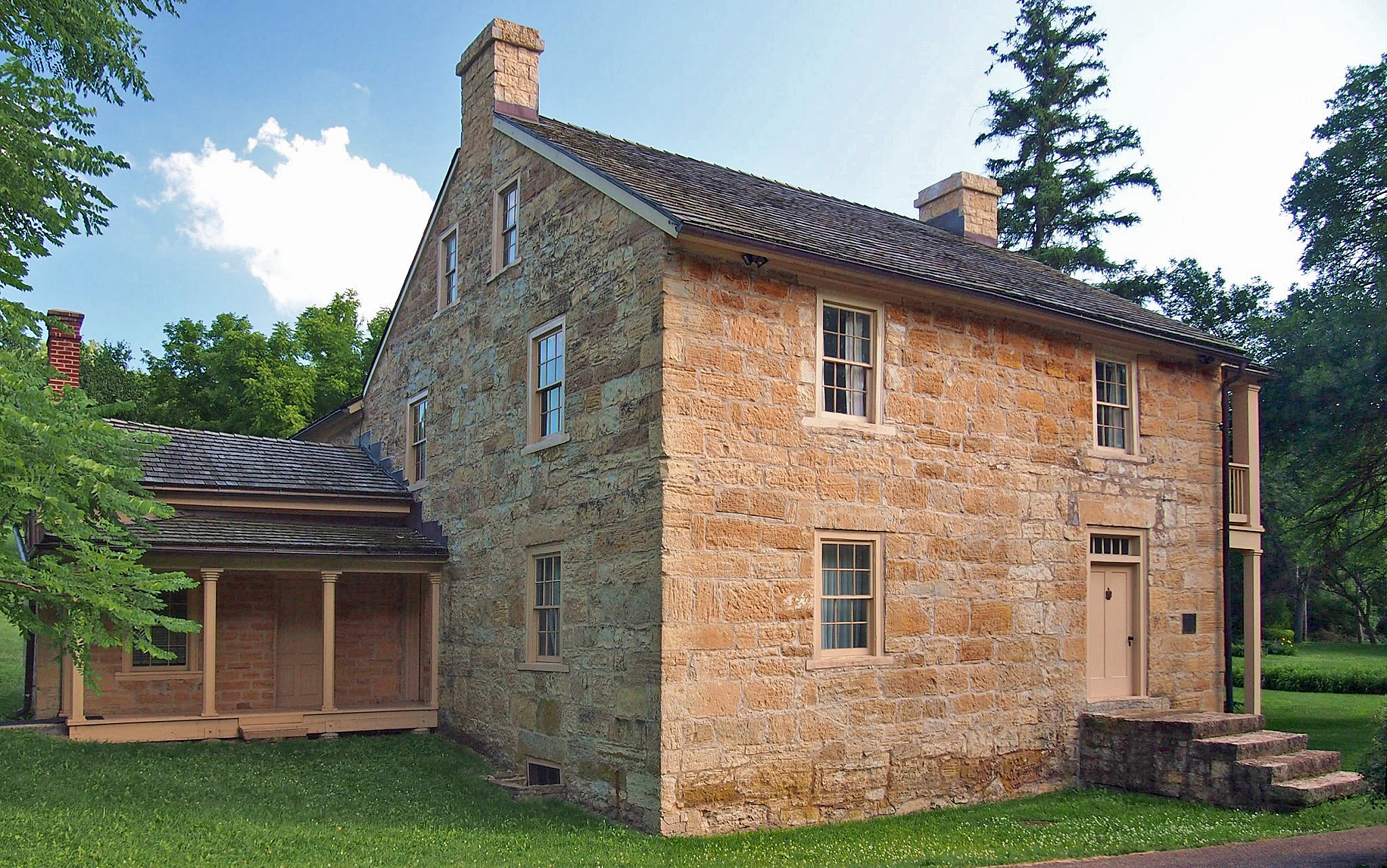
Front view of Sibley's limestone house in Mendota

=== Home in Saint Peters (Mendota) ===
In 1836, Sibley hired John Mueller to start building work in St. Peters at what is now known as the Sibley House Historic Site. The Sibley House has historically been referred to as "the oldest stone house in Minnesota". The first new building built by Sibley was actually a stone warehouse, completed in 1836. Work on his actual residence most likely started in 1837 or 1838 and may not have been fully completed until 1839. Immediately following his marriage to Sarah Jane Steele and well into the 1850s, Henry Sibley began a series of alterations to his house to accommodate his growing family and transform it from a hunting lodge into a Victorian family home.

During his bachelor years, Sibley hosted many famous travelers in his home, including French geographer Joseph Nicollet, who spent the winter of 1836–37 with Sibley. Over the years, questions have been raised as to whether Sibley's cook, Joe Robinson, was a slave or a free man. Evidence suggests that if Robinson was in fact a slave at this time, he belonged to Hercules L. Dousman and may have been "on loan" to Sibley.

Sibley famously wrote, "It may seem paradoxical, but it is nevertheless true, that I was successively a citizen of Michigan, Wisconsin, Iowa and Minnesota Territories, without changing my residence at Mendota." Until 1857, the site of Sibley's home and the community around it were technically part of the Fort Snelling military reservation. Henry Sibley lived with his family in Mendota until 1862, when he sold his home to St. Peters Catholic Parish and moved to St. Paul.

=== Relationship with Red Blanket Woman ===
During the winter of 1840–41, Sibley entered a relationship with Red Blanket Woman (Tahshinahohindoway), daughter of Bad Hail (Wasuwicaxtaxni), a Mdewakanton sub-chief, and of partly French descent. They were part of a hunting expedition to the Red Cedar, which included 150 Dakota men and their families, as well as mixed-blood fur trader Alexander Faribault. While the details of their relationship are obscure, most accounts suggest that Sibley and Red Blanket Woman were married "in the Dakota manner" before or during the hunting trip. There has also been considerable speculation that Bad Hail had actively sought to establish kinship ties with Sibley for some time. In the final page of his unfinished autobiography, Sibley recounted that "an Indian sub-chief" had brought his daughter to his log house in the middle of the night for protection during the winter of 1835–36. Sibley wrote that he had declined to take her in as his wife, and that the two visitors had left his house "disappointed, and mortified, at the ill success of their mission." Although Sibley did not specify whether that man was Bad Hail, researcher Bruce A. Kohn states that it may well have been.

On August 28, 1841, Red Blanket Woman gave birth to their daughter Helen Hastings Sibley, also known as Wakiye (Bird). Monsignor Augustin Ravoux, a Catholic missionary, baptized "Hélène", daughter of Tahshinahohindoway and an unnamed father, with fur trader William Henry Forbes named as her godfather. In February 1842, Forbes sent a cryptic update to Sibley, who was in Washington, apparently about Red Blanket Woman and the baby. The evidence is unclear as to how long Red Blanket Woman lived in the area. Some sources suggest that Tahshinahohindoway remarried a Dakota man, perhaps in 1842, and died in early 1843. However, trading post records show that Tahshinahohindoway had made purchases of blankets, clothing and other items as late as 1846.

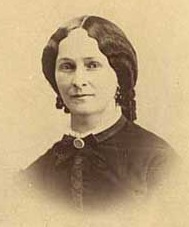
First Lady Sarah Jane Sibley, 1858

=== Marriage to Sarah Jane Steele ===
On May 2, 1843, Henry Sibley married Sarah Jane Steele, the 20-year-old sister of Franklin Steele, an entrepreneur from Pennsylvania who had staked the first claim to the east bank of the Mississippi River at Saint Anthony Falls and had operated the sutler's store at Fort Snelling since 1839. Sarah Jane was the eldest daughter of James Steele, who had served as Inspector General of Pennsylvania Troops during the War of 1812 and as a legislator in the Pennsylvania General Assembly, and built a paper- and cotton-milling business with one of his brothers. Her three sisters eventually moved west with their mother following the death of their father in 1845. In 1847, her sister Abbian Steele married Dr. Thomas R. Potts of Galena, Illinois, and moved with him to Saint Paul, Minnesota, where Potts became one of the town's first physicians, its first mayor, and a close friend of Henry Sibley.

From 1856 until her death in 1869, Sarah Jane Sibley served on the Mount Vernon Ladies' Association as Vice Regent in charge of fundraising in Minnesota. She appointed roughly two dozen "lady managers" to assist fundraising efforts for the historical preservation of Mount Vernon, including Mary LeDuc and Rebecca Flandreau, who would succeed her. In an effort to transcend political divisions, Sarah Jane established a male advisory board including Henry Sibley's bitter enemy within the Democratic Party, Daniel A. Robertson, along with future Republican state legislator John B. Sanborn and future governor Henry A. Swift. The advisory board also included many of Henry Sibley's business contacts such as Richard Chute, Alexis Bailly and Martin McLeod, and family friends such as John S. Prince and William Gates LeDuc.

In her later years, Sarah Jane suffered from recurring pleurisy and pregnancies, which kept her confined to bed for much of the time. In July 1859, she sent MVLA Regent Ann Pamela Cunningham a letter of resignation which was declined. In 1860, Henry also wrote to Cunningham on Sarah's behalf, but his plea to allow her to resign due to ill health was ignored. In 1862, the Sibley family moved to their new home at 417 Woodward Street in St. Paul – a move that Sarah had longed for during many years but reportedly was unable to enjoy due to depression and illness. Sarah Jane Sibley died of complications from pneumonia on May 21, 1869, at the age of 46.

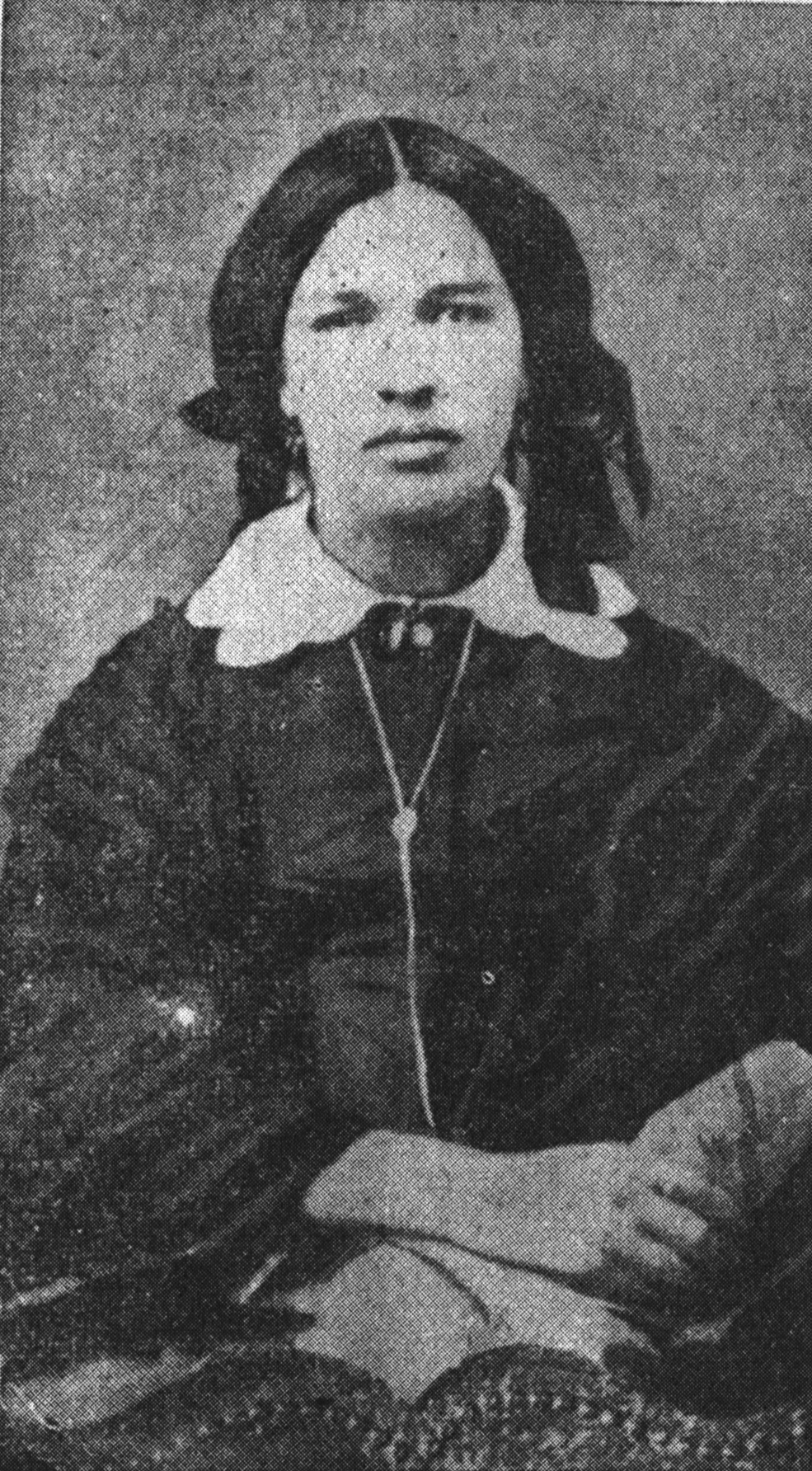
Helen Hastings Sibley (Wakiye)

=== Relationship with daughter Helen ===
When Helen was about six years old, Henry Sibley arranged to have Helen adopted by William Reynolds Brown, an Anglo-American farmer, and his wife Martha. They had both worked at the Methodist mission in Kaposia — William as a carpenter and Martha as a teacher. Martha Brown reported that Helen spoke French when she came to live with them, suggesting that she learned the language from her Mdewakanton family and relatives. Sibley provided for his daughter financially, paying the Browns to support Helen, and financed her education, including boarding school in the eastern U.S. As a young woman living in St. Paul, she was said to be fully acculturated and accepted by white society, with a considerable income as a result of Sibley's investment of her treaty annuities.

Henry Sibley maintained a congenial and public relationship with Helen, although this reportedly upset his wife Sarah Jane; Henry's past relationship with Helen's mother fueled criticism in Republican newspapers, which questioned his character and called him a "Moccasin Democrat". Henry and Helen were often seen chatting at his picket-fence gate. On September 1, 1858, they were both very prominent in a St. Paul parade celebrating the laying of the transatlantic cable in September 1858, where Helen was one of 33 young women selected to represent the states of the Union. The Daily Minnesotian identified Miss Delaware as "Helen Sibley" with no further comment.

In 1859, Helen married Sylvester Sawyer, an Anglo-American doctor, and was given away by Governor Sibley at her wedding in the front parlor of the Browns' house in St. Paul. They agreed that Helen would not use Sibley as her surname on the couple's marriage certificate, but Henry signed the certificate "H.H. Sibley" as a witness. Helen died less than a year later of scarlet fever after giving birth to a baby girl who also died. In 1860, Sawyer wrote that Governor Sibley mourned the loss of his first-born child Helen "sincerely and truly".

=== Other children ===
Henry and Sarah Jane Sibley had at least nine children, four of whom survived until adulthood, including Augusta Ann, born in 1844; Sarah Jane, born in 1851; Charles Frederic, born in 1860; and Alfred Brush, born in 1866. Five died as young children: Henry Hastings (1846), Henry Hastings (1847–51), Franklin Steele (1853–63), Mary Steele (1855–63), and Alexander Hastings (1864).

In 1868, their eldest daughter Augusta married Captain Douglas Pope, Sibley's former aide-de-camp who had been based at Fort Snelling. When his wife Sarah died in 1869, Henry was left with two young sons, including Freddie who was eight years old and Allie who was not yet three, as well as 18-year-old Sallie (Sarah Jane). Sallie married Elbert A. Young, a Saint Paul wholesale merchant, in 1875.

Henry Sibley did not remarry, but his sister-in-law Abbie Potts helped to take care of the boys and served as his housekeeper and hostess, and in later years as his nurse. After Douglas Pope died suddenly in 1880, Sibley's daughter Augusta (Gussie) moved into his house in St. Paul with her three daughters.

== Other business ventures ==
In the years after the 1837 treaties were signed, the fur trade itself changed significantly. In local parlance, it became known as the "Indian trade", reflecting the industry's increasing reliance on U.S. government annuities paid to, or on behalf of, the Native American tribes in the region. The growing white population in the Upper Mississippi — including lumbermen, speculators and farmers — also spurred the growth of the general mercantile trade.

Henry Sibley sought to diversify his own business activities into other areas, even as he worked for American Fur Company and later for Pierre Chouteau Jr. and Company. However, Sibley never achieved great commercial success as an entrepreneur, and would later lament his "want of success in business".

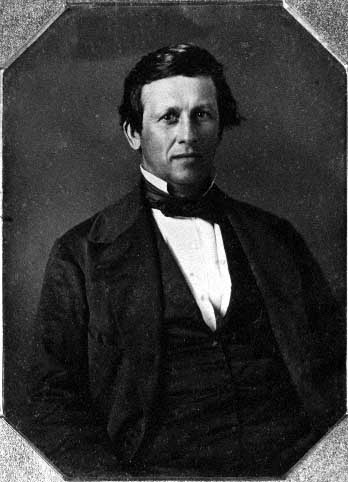
Hercules L. Dousman, Sibley's business partner in many ventures

=== Timber and sawmill business ===
As early as 1837, Sibley, together with traders William Aitken and Lyman Warren, had entered into an exclusive contract with the Ojibwe of St. Croix valley to cut timber along the Upper St. Croix and Snake Rivers. Under the terms of the contract, the 47 Ojibwe signatories agreed not to harass any lumbermen working for the three traders. In return, the traders would provide specified goods to the Ojibwe, including gunpowder, lead, scalping knives and tobacco, every year for ten years. After the contract was superseded by the White Pine Treaty of 1837, Sibley and Warren joined with Hercules L. Dousman in building a sawmill at Chippewa Falls. The Chippewa Mills went into operation in 1840 but was sold in 1845, much to the relief of Dousman.

=== Steamboat investments ===
In the 1840s, Hercules Dousman became interested in the steamboat industry and often bought shares in boats on behalf of Henry Sibley as well as himself. In 1844, Sibley acquired one-eighth of a steamboat called the "Lynx", which was half-owned by Dousman. Although the Lynx netted only $161.04 during the 1844 season after deducting losses due to damage to the boat, in 1845, the Lynx netted $11,194.73. However, there were delays in collecting payment from shippers, leading Captain John Atchison to delay paying dividends to investors. Frustrated, Dousman put considerable pressure on Sibley over several months to make a "final settlement" with Atchison.

In 1847, Dousman and Sibley, together with Henry Mower Rice, Bernard Brisbois and others, purchased shares in a packet company with steamboats running on a regular schedule between Galena, Illinois and ports in Minnesota. The first boat of the Galena Packet Company, the "Argo", sank in October 1847, but its new boat, the "Dr. Franklin", launched successfully in 1848.

=== General merchandise store ===
In 1844, Sibley contracted with David Faribault to open a general merchandise store in Saint Paul, which was initially independent of Pierre Chouteau Jr. and Company. Because cash was scarce, many customers including white settlers paid for goods with fur pelts and deerskins. From 1847, the store was managed by William Henry Forbes. Business grew as the population of lumbermen and metal prospectors increased steadily east of the Mississippi River. Sibley also opened the first general store in Mendota together with his clerk and business partner Hypolite Dupuis.

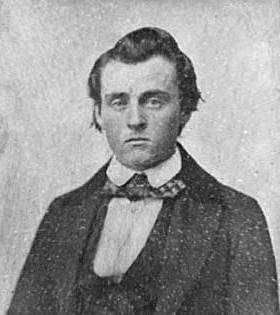
Norman Kittson worked for Sibley as head of the Upper Mississippi Outfit's western business

=== Trade with the Métis and Ojibwe ===
In 1842, the American Fur Company's Western Outfit was sold to Pierre Choteau Jr. and Company, forming their new Upper Mississippi Outfit. In the original contract, the Upper Mississippi Outfits's trade was described as "trade with whites and Indians", reflecting the changing demographics of the region. As part of Choteau Company, Henry Sibley was no longer bound by the American Fur Company's agreement with the British Hudson's Bay Company to refrain from trading along the border with Canada. In response to market demand, Sibley also shifted his focus to trading for buffalo robes.

In 1842, Sibley briefly entered into a secret arrangement with Franklin Steele and Norman Kittson allowing them to conduct trade on a cash basis at Coldwater and up the Minnesota River at Little Rapids, Traverse des Sioux, and Lac qui Parle, even though this brought them into direct competition with Sibley's own traders including Jean-Baptiste Faribault and Joseph Renville. In the spring of 1843, Sibley entered into an agreement with Norman Kittson, in which Kittson would run all of the Upper Mississippi Outfit's western business. Kittson was tasked with supervising Renville at Lac qui Parle, building a new post at Big Stone Lake, and sending traders out along the Sheyenne River and the upper James River.

In 1844, Kittson started building a trading post at Pembina, which would allow Sibley's Upper Mississippi Outfit to trade with the Ojibwe and the Métis. Many Métis and Ojibwe hunters from the north were willing to make illegal trips across the international border to get higher prices for their fur pelts than what the British would pay. From Pembina, Kittson sent large trains of carts along the "Plains Trail" west of the Red River and down the Minnesota valley, well-defended against possible attacks by Dakota hunters who were resentful of the whole slaughter of buffalo by the Métis and had threatened to stop any goods from going across their country to the north.

After the death of Joseph Renville in 1846, young Canadian fur trader Martin McLeod took responsibility for trade at Lac qui Parle, Big Stone Lake, and further west on the Dakota plains, freeing Kittson from having to collect furs there. Kittson then started trying out a shorter route from the Upper Red River to Lake Minnewaska, then along the Crow and Sauk Rivers to the Mississippi, and Sibley himself visited the area in 1847.

=== Provisions for British troops ===
Both the Hudson's Bay Company, and Ramsay Crooks, who still controlled what remained of the American Fur Company, were angered by increasing competition from Sibley and Kittson. In August 1846, 350 British troops arrived in the Red River settlement, in response to the Hudson's Bay Company's call for help to put an end to further smuggling.

Ironically, the Hudson's Bay Company quickly found that they lacked enough provisions to supply the British forces and had to send buyers overland to the Mississippi to purchase supplies. As they ran into further problems in shipping their provisions up the Red River, Henry Sibley graciously offered his assistance. From this time onward, Sibley and Kittson proceeded to build a thriving business in supplying the British troops with everything from champagne to sheet iron stoves, transporting goods up the Red River Trail.

=== Trade with the Dakota ===
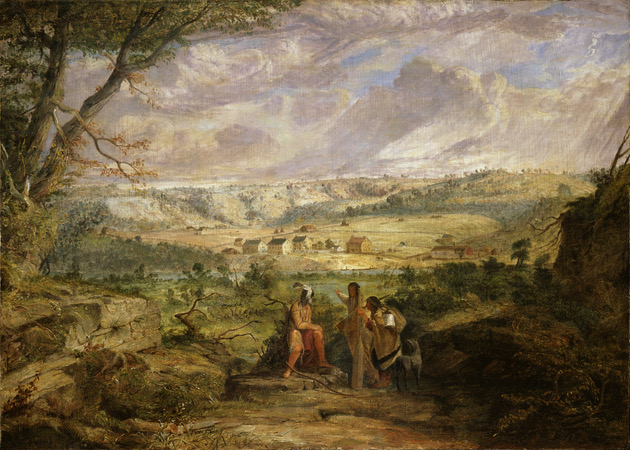
View of Mendota from Fort Snelling (1848), painting by Seth Eastman

Sibley's trade with the western Dakota bands declined sharply in the 1840s. In 1844, a measles epidemic led to a decline in the number of Dakota hunters, and the dwindling population of elk, buffalo and other game forced the remaining hunters to push westward. In 1844 and 1845, bad weather and prairie fires temporarily drove the buffalo into the James River valley, but in the years that followed, the herds virtually disappeared. In 1846, drought and the failure of the corn crop made things worse, particularly among the Sisseton and Wahpeton bands, and traders including Martin McLeod and Norman Kittson had to extend credit to the Dakota in the form of food.

The Mdewakantons, on the other hand, were somewhat cushioned by the annuities they received from the 1837 treaty. In addition, some Mdewakantons such as Taoyateduta Little Crow, who succeeded his father as chief of the Kaposia band in 1846, found ways to trade which effectively competed with Sibley's business. By 1848, a ring of Dakota including Little Crow had become so successful in trading whiskey for fur skins that Sibley and McLeod were compelled to set up river patrols to stop any canoes carrying contraband to the west.

From 1842 to 1846, Sibley also bought buffalo hides from Joseph R. Brown on his personal account, even though Brown was a competitor of Choteau Company's Upper Mississippi Outfit. When Brown finally exited the fur trade, Sibley bought out his interests and assets on generous terms.

=== Formation of the Northern Outfit ===
In the summer of 1848, Henry Mower Rice, who had taken over trade with the Winnebago when Hercules Dousman exited the business, proposed the creation of a new Northern Outfit. The Northern Outfit combined the Dakota, Winnebago and Ojibwe trade under a single business unit. The Choteau Company held half of the firm, while Sibley, Rice and a new partner, Sylvanus Lowry, each held one-sixth. Sibley would later come to regret this move.

== Early experience in public office ==
Henry Sibley was initiated into public life as a young man in Michigan Territory when he received his first commission as justice of the peace of Mackinac County from Governor George Bryan Porter.

=== Magistrate in Iowa Territory ===
After moving to Mendota, Sibley received a similar commission as a justice of the peace of Clayton County, which he called "an empire of itself" in size, extending from a line twenty miles below Prairie du Chien on the west of the Mississippi River to Pembina, and across to the Missouri River. He had been appointed by Governor John Chambers of the newly organized Iowa Territory in 1838, and received extensions to his commission through 1842. Sibley later stated that it was his "fortune to be the first to introduce the machinery of law...into what was a benighted region" and that he had felt free of oversight:

"As I was the only magistrate in this region and the county seat was some three hundred miles distant, I had matters pretty much under my own control, there being little chance of an appeal from my decisions. In fact some of the simple-minded people around me, firmly believed that I had the power of life and death."

As justice of the peace, Sibley heard a wide range of cases. In 1838, he was called to investigate the death of John Hays, a former sergeant at Fort Snelling, which has been billed as the "oldest murder mystery in Minnesota". The investigation resulted in the arrest of Edward Phalen, Hays's business partner, a few weeks later. For jurisdictional reasons, however, Sibley passed on the case to Joseph R. Brown, who was appointed as justice of the peace for Crawford County in 1839, and Phalen was found not guilty of murder despite his self-incriminatory testimony.

In 1840, Sibley was called upon to hear a criminal case involving the brutal rape of a ten-year-old girl which took place in Wisconsin Territory, because justice of the peace Joseph Brown was away at the legislature in Madison.

== Lobbying in Washington ==
=== Lobbyist for the Doty Treaty ===
Following the defeat of Jacksonian Democrat Martin Van Buren in the 1840 United States presidential election, the new Secretary of War John Bell moved quickly to try to purchase land from the Dakota. Bell had long been a proponent of a plan commissioned by John C. Calhoun and written by Reverend Jedidiah Morse which had called for the creation of an "all-Indian territory" that would eventually become a state. Bell's stated intention was to remove all Indians from the northeastern United States to the Minnesota valley.

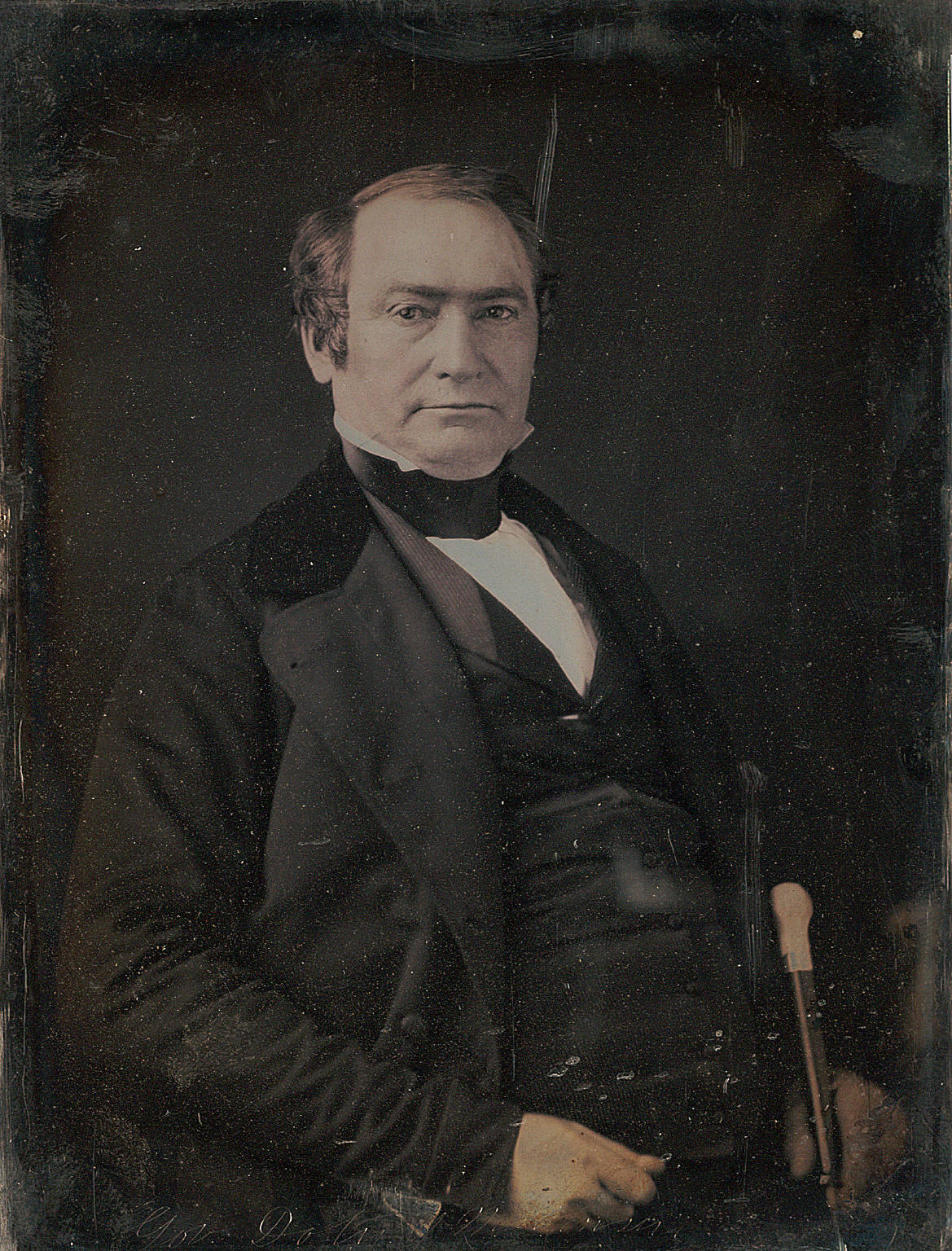
Governor James Duane Doty of Wisconsin Territory negotiated abortive treaties with the Dakota in 1841 with help from Sibley

Much to the surprise of Henry Sibley and the partners of the American Fur Company's Western Outfit, John Bell appointed Governor James Duane Doty of Wisconsin Territory to negotiate a treaty with the Dakota to acquire 30 million acres of land on behalf of the U.S. and require their settlement in farming communities as part of a plan to grant citizenship.

On July 31, 1841, Governor Doty concluded a treaty with the Sisseton, Wahpeton and Wahpekute in Traverse des Sioux, with assistance from Alexis Bailly as secretary, although several major chiefs including Sleepy Eyes and Burning Earth did not participate. Doty testified that Sibley and several of his subsidiary traders and employees had provided "indispensable aid" in securing agreement from the Dakota. Specifically, Sibley had promised the Dakota bands that he would supply the goods worth $10,000 which Doty had agreed to as gifts.

On August 4, 1841, Doty concluded a similar treaty with Mdewakanton in Mendota, and then left, tasking Sibley and Hercules L. Dousman with securing signatures from chiefs Wacouta and Wabasha III, who had refused to attend the signing.

Dousman was pleased with the Doty Treaty, which included up to $150,000 to compensate traders for debts held by the Dakota, despite the fact that Bell had specifically forbidden such a clause. The treaty also called for paying off the "mixed-bloods" who had had land set aside for them by the Fourth Treaty of Prairie du Chien in 1830, many of whom owed sizable debts to the Western Outfit.

Furthermore, Doty had recommended twelve individuals for positions in the new territory, including Henry H. Sibley for the post of superintendent or governor, plus eight other traders associated with the Sioux Outfit. Sibley wrote to Ramsay Crooks on August 26, 1841:

"The provisions of this treaty, I consider to be better calculated for securing the interests of the Indians and of the people in the country than those of any treaty which has been made with the north-western Indians."

However, any hope that the treaty would be ratified quickly disappeared as animosity grew between President John Tyler, who had succeeded President William Henry Harrison after he died only a month after inauguration, and Tyler's inherited cabinet, as well as the national Whig Party. By the end of the summer, most of the cabinet including John Bell had resigned. As one of his final acts as Secretary of War, Bell sent the Doty treaty to the Senate and recommended it for urgent approval, but further consideration of the treaty was tabled until the spring. Senator Thomas Hart Benton of Missouri voiced his vehement opposition to President Tyler, writing: "The whole scheme of the treaty, & the terms of it is in my own opinion the most unjustifiable & reprehensible thing of the kind that has come before the Senate." He opposed the policy of government-assisted "civilization" underpinning the treaty, as well as the fact that it was trying to circumvent longstanding laws governing the formation of new territories.

In January 1842, Ramsay Crooks sent Henry Sibley to Washington to serve as the chief manager of the lobbying effort for the Doty Treaty, reminding him that the future of the Western Outfit "depend[ed] very much" on its ratification. The new Secretary of War, John Canfield Spencer, was a steadfast supporter of the treaty and came to rely heavily on Sibley for information about relations with Native American tribes in the region. The two senators from Michigan, William Woodbridge and Augustus Seymour Porter, favored the treaty, but the main obstacle to ratification was the opposition of Senator Thomas Benton, who also chaired the Committee on Indian Affairs. Sibley enlisted help from influencers including Pierre Chouteau Jr. and Joseph Nicollet, both of whom were highly respected by Senator Benton, to convince him to change his mind. Nevertheless, Benton remained staunchly opposed, and major modifications to the treaty failed to produce any breakthrough. Sibley left Washington in April, leaving all further lobbying to Robert Stuart, his former manager at American Fur Company in Mackinac, who had by then had become superintendent of Indian affairs for Michigan.

On August 29, 1842, the Senate voted against ratification of the Doty treaty with the Dakota by a vote of 26 to 2. With the defeat of the treaty, Sibley's prospects as governor of a new all-Indian territory in the northwest faded completely. Helen Sibley's biographer, Bruce A. Kohn, adds, "The lands of the Dakota would not become a homeland for indigenous peoples where Helen might have lived with her mother."

=== Lobbyist against Winnebago relocation ===
In October 1846, a few Winnebago leaders signed a treaty with the U.S. in which they agreed to move their people north to an unspecified tract of land between the Dakota and Ojibwe. Both Hercules L. Dousman and Henry Mower Rice were active in engineering the agreement. The treaty was contingent on land being secured from either the Dakota or the Ojibwe tribes. Dousman probably expected Sibley to persuade the Dakota to cede land for this purpose, but Sibley was firmly opposed to relocating the Winnebago as a "buffer" between the Dakota and Ojibwe.

In December 1846, Sibley went to Washington to lobby against the relocation of the Winnebago, hoping to persuade Michigan Senator Lewis Cass to oppose the treaty. Dousman suspected Sibley's intentions, and the relationship between the two men cooled significantly.

Despite Sibley's efforts, Congress ratified the treaty in January 1847. The Dakota remained opposed to any sale of land, but Rice convinced the Ojibwe to give up a tract west of the Mississippi between the Watab and Crow Wing Rivers. In the fall of 1847, Sibley wrote to his friend Charles Christopher Trowbridge regarding the Winnebago:

"These poor fellows will be thrust between the powerful contending tribes of Sioux and Chippewas, and I fear they will fare badly... The whole policy pursued by the Govt. toward the Western Indians generally, has a tendency to destroy them, and that speedily. They dare now avow this as their object,...but by persisting in a course which they have been repeatedly warned must end in the extinction of the tribes, they show how little real regard they have for their welfare."

In the summer of 1848, the Winnebago reluctantly began to move, with assistance from Colonel Seth Eastman and a company of infantry from Fort Snelling. Dousman and Rice received payment for "tribal debts". Dousman, who had chosen not to renew his contract with Choteau and Company after the original contract expired in 1846, had exited the fur trade and focused on his other business ventures.

== Political career ==
=== Boundary with Wisconsin and governmental vacuum ===
In December 1847, Wisconsin's second constitutional convention voted to place the northwestern border of Wisconsin at the Rum and Mississippi Rivers. In January 1848, St. Paul citizens petitioned Congress to oppose the proposed Rum River boundary. Rather than being relegated to a minor role at the far western edge of the new state, they envisioned St. Paul at the center of a new territorial government. Henry Sibley vigorously supported their efforts to keep St. Paul and the St. Croix valley out of the borders of Wisconsin, bringing him into direct conflict with his old business partner Hercules L. Dousman. Dousman once again had his eye on further opportunities to obtain treaty money, and wrote to Sibley that a Wisconsin border on the Rum River line would create pressure for a major Dakota land cession to the west of the Mississippi River.

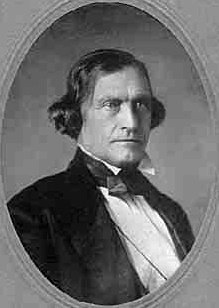
Joseph R. Brown sold his fur trade interests to Sibley and later became an important political ally

Wisconsin became a state on May 29, 1848, with Wisconsin's northwestern border finally pushed back to the St. Croix River. The residents of St. Paul, the lumbermen along the St. Croix, and the sawmill workers of St. Anthony Falls suddenly found themselves in a peculiar legal and governmental vacuum. Although most of them had protested against inclusion in the new state of Wisconsin, they were shocked and disappointed to find themselves left behind in "a no-man's land without law or government...its people without corporate existence."

==== Appointment as delegate by Stillwater convention ====
On August 26, 1848, Sibley attended a "convention" held in Stillwater which had been called by several concerned citizens of the St. Croix valley, as well as Joseph R. Brown, Franklin Steele and himself. During the convention, Joseph Brown was appointed chair of a committee which drafted "memorials" to Congress and to the president, requesting the formation of a territory of Minnesota as soon as possible.

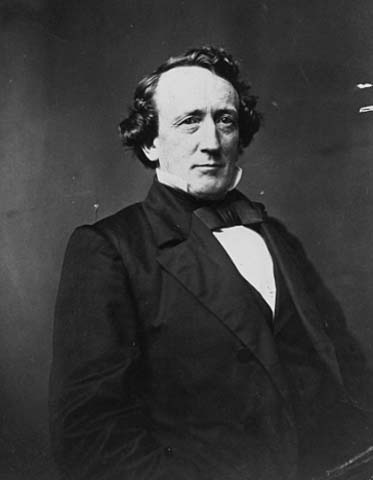
Henry Mower Rice became a major political rival to Sibley

The main resolution of the convention was to then appoint "a delegate to visit Washington to represent the interests of the proposed territory, with full power to act." Sibley let it be known that he was willing to go to Washington to present the memorials and lobby for the new territory on his own expense. He received the majority of votes and was declared unanimously elected by the convention. Upon a motion introduced by Morton S. Wilkinson, Henry H. Sibley was issued with a certificate signed by the officers of the convention that he had been duly elected as their representative in Washington. The memorials were then signed by the 61 delegates of the convention and adjourned.

==== Election for Congressional delegate from "Wisconsin Territory" ====
In parallel with these developments, John Catlin, who had been secretary of the former Wisconsin Territory, started to promote the idea that the territory of Wisconsin continued to exist in the area that had been excluded from the state of Wisconsin, since the original act creating the territory had not been repealed by Congress. By that logic, Catlin himself was now acting governor by law. Once John Hubbard Tweedy, who had been the delegate to Congress from Wisconsin Territory, formally resigned his position, the acting governor could then lawfully call an election to fill the vacancy.

On September 18, John H. Tweedy resigned, and on October 9, 1848, acting Governor Catlin issued a proclamation for an election to be held on October 30.

At first, the general expectation was that Henry H. Sibley would be the obvious choice for the role. His election campaign took an unexpected turn when his new business partner in the Northern Outfit, Henry Mower Rice, declared his candidacy for the role. Technically, neither Sibley nor Rice were residents of "Wisconsin Territory", but this was not required by law and the question was never raised. After a brief campaign, Sibley won the election with 236 votes to Rice's 122 votes. Sibley had stronger support in St. Paul and the St. Croix valley, while Rice found his strongest support from his own employees and business associates at Crow Wing, as well as the majority of mill workers at St. Anthony Falls, where Rice was said to have bought votes outright on election day.

==== Speech before House Committee and recognition by Congress ====
In early November 1848, Sibley made the long journey to Washington with his wife Sarah and their two children. On December 22, 1848, Henry H, Sibley delivered his famous speech before the House Committee on Elections. Henry Sibley's biographer, Rhoda R. Gilman, writes:

That winter in Washington was not only the beginning, but also in one sense the high point of Sibley's political career. Certainly it was the most satisfying part, for he became at once an agent of history and a symbol of the new territory. The tale of how he rose, polished and urbane, before a Congress that had expected a figure in buckskin and eloquently defended the right of pioneers to the protection of government and law became — almost immediately — Minnesota's most cherished founding legend.

=== Congressional delegate for Minnesota Territory ===
The Wisconsin Territory's at-large congressional district was eliminated with the creation of the Territory of Minnesota on March 3, 1849. He was subsequently elected as the first representative of the Minnesota Territory's at-large congressional district, serving in the 31st and 32nd congresses from July 7, 1849 – March 3, 1853.

=== Legislator in Minnesota Territorial House of Representatives ===
Sibley was elected to the Minnesota Territorial House of Representatives, convened from January to March 1855, as the representative of Dakota County.

=== President of Minnesota Constitutional Convention ===
He was a member of the Democratic Party wing of the first Minnesota Constitutional Convention, of which he eventually became president. Assembled July 13, 1857, the convention resulted in adoption of the constitution as framed on October 13, 1857.

=== First governor of state of Minnesota ===
In 1857, Sibley was elected as the first governor of the state, and is one of just three Minnesota Democrats to win a gubernatorial election with a Democrat in the White House. He served from May 24, 1858, until January 2, 1860. After narrowly defeating Republican Alexander Ramsey in the first state gubernatorial contest, Sibley declared in his inaugural address, "I have no object and no interests which are not inseparably bound up with the welfare of the state." He did not seek reelection. On August 2, 1858, he signed into law the legislation allowing for the creation of Minnesota's first higher education institutions, then known as normal schools.

==== Railroad bond issue ====
When the legislature voted for the state to issue bonds to the railroads to provide for construction of the transcontinental route, Sibley refused. He said the railroads did not give priority of lien to the state on their property. The state supreme court ordered the governor to issue the legislatively authorized state bonds to railroads. The legislature asked him to market the bonds in New York. Although he made an effort to do, the capitalists refused to buy the bonds. The state subsequently repudiated the issuance.

== Role in Dakota War of 1862 ==
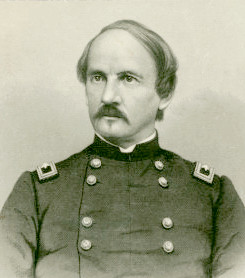
Henry Hastings Sibley in uniform, 1862

In the wake of treaties negotiated with them by Sibley, Native American tribes that had until recently roamed freely across the territory were severely diminished in land and resource rights. By 1858, the Dakota, Ojibwe and Winnebago were relegated to reservations. The changes were particularly harsh for the Dakota, who were forced to live on a reservation located on narrow slice of land by the Minnesota River. By 1862, the pressure had become too much. The Sioux now claim they were coerced and manipulated to relinquish their own culture and religion and routinely misled and cheated by Sibley and others. Faced with starvation and missed annuity payments due them from the federal government, largely due to the ongoing Civil War, many Dakota people saw an opportunity to retake the lands of Minnesota and began attacking the settlers in an effort to drive them out.

=== Commanding Officer ===
On August 19, 1862, Governor Alexander Ramsey appointed former Governor Sibley as colonel of volunteers. He was directed to the upper Minnesota River to lead an expedition of relief to Fort Ridgely, which had been under attack from Dakota warriors led by Little Crow. On August 29, Sibley's forces rescued the 250 settlers left after the Dakota abandoned the fort four days earlier, after their failed attempt to capture it.

After that, he was involved in the engagement of Birch Coulee and Wood Lake. The last engagement was a decisive battle. It resulted in the Dakota releasing 269 captives – 107 European-American and 162 biracial.

=== Military commission and trials ===
Between September 28 and November 5, 1862, a military commission created by Sibley as commanding officer conducted 392 trials for murder, participation in murder, participation in combat, and rape. It was a court with no lawyers for the defendants. Some of the trials lasted only a few minutes. By November 5, the commission had sentenced 307 men to death and given 16 prison terms. Sibley approved all death sentences except for one and passed the results on to General John Pope; by November 7, they had cut the total number of death sentences to 303. On December 6, 1862, President Abraham Lincoln approved 39 of the 303 death sentences after having two advisors review them. Thirty-eight men were hanged at Mankato, December 26, 1862, including at least one whose sentence had been commuted by President Lincoln.

The remaining 300 Dakota warriors were imprisoned and more than 1,600 non-combatants: women, children and elderly were held in a crowded encampment on Pike Island below Fort Snelling until river transportation resumed in the spring . A palisade was erected to protect the interned from the soldiers and settlers after one of the women was assaulted. Many died as a result of a measles epidemic that swept the camp in December.

For his efforts, Sibley was promoted to brigadier-general of volunteers, September 29, 1862, after the hostilities had ended. Sibley turned over his command to Colonel Stephen A. Miller of the 7th Minnesota Infantry Regiment. On November 25, he became commander of the newly created Military District of Minnesota, with headquarters in St. Paul.\

=== Expedition of 1863 ===
Meanwhile, treaties with the Dakota were nullified and Sibley proceeded with leading the banishment of all tribal members from the state to reservations in the Dakotas and Nebraska. The state offered a reward for the scalp of any Dakota man killed in Minnesota.

For the next two years Sibley and General Alfred Sully led a large and vicious campaigns to pursue Dakota escapees as far west as the Yellowstone River. In 1863, Sibley led what was then-considered a successful expedition against the Sioux in Dakota Territory. This campaign included the battles of Big Mound (July 24), Dead Buffalo Lake (July 26), and Stony Lake (July 28). This period would become the start of bloody wars between the U.S. government and Dakota that lasted nearly twenty years.

On November 29, 1865, he was brevetted as major-general of the volunteers for "efficient and meritorious services". He was honorably mustered out on April 30, 1866. He was relieved from the command of the Military District of Minnesota with the disbandment of the district in August 1866.

== Involvement in Indian affairs ==
After his military service, Sibley was active in settling several Indian treaties.

== Ongoing business interests ==
Sibley served as the president of several railroads, banks, and other large corporations.

=== Railroad bond issue ===
Sibley dedicated considerable energy to trying to resolve the railroad bond issue.

== Civic responsibilities ==
=== Minnesota Historical Society and Old Settler's Association ===
He also served a variety of civic organizations. He became a member of the Minnesota Historical Society in 1849 and eventually served as president. He joined the Old Settlers' association of that state in 1858.

=== St. Paul Chamber of Commerce ===
In December 1866, Henry Sibley took the lead in reestablishing the St. Paul Chamber of Commerce. He served numerous terms as its president, and focused its efforts on public and charitable projects. In July 1872, Sibley shared his concerns for the welfare of Old Bets, who was living on his property in Mendota but was too ill to provide for herself. Betsey, an elderly Mdewakanton woman, had been a well known figure in St. Paul, and was widely respected for her kindness toward the white captives during the Dakota War of 1862. Sibley passed a hat and raised $63.60 from the board members which was contributed to Saint Peter's Church, specifically for her care.

In 1873, a massive grasshopper infestation ruined crops across southwestern Minnesota, and spread even further the following summer. In December 1873, Sibley worked with the St. Paul Chamber of Commerce to raise $6,000 to aid families in Cottonwood County. They formed an executive committee to approach members of the business community for contributions; Sibley himself contacted the directors and out-of-state shareholders of the railroads which ran through the affected area. In 1874, Governor Cushman Kellogg Davis asked Sibley to administer the distribution of $19,000 in funds raised for the relief of settlers worst affected by the grasshopper invasion, working with John S. Pillsbury of Minneapolis.

=== Board appointments ===
In 1867 he was appointed to the board of visitors to the U.S. Military Academy at West Point. He was also president of the board of regents of the University of Minnesota, and president of the Board of Indian Commissioners from 1875 to 1876. He was awarded an honorary LL.D. from the College of New Jersey (later known as Princeton University), in 1888.

== Death and legacy ==
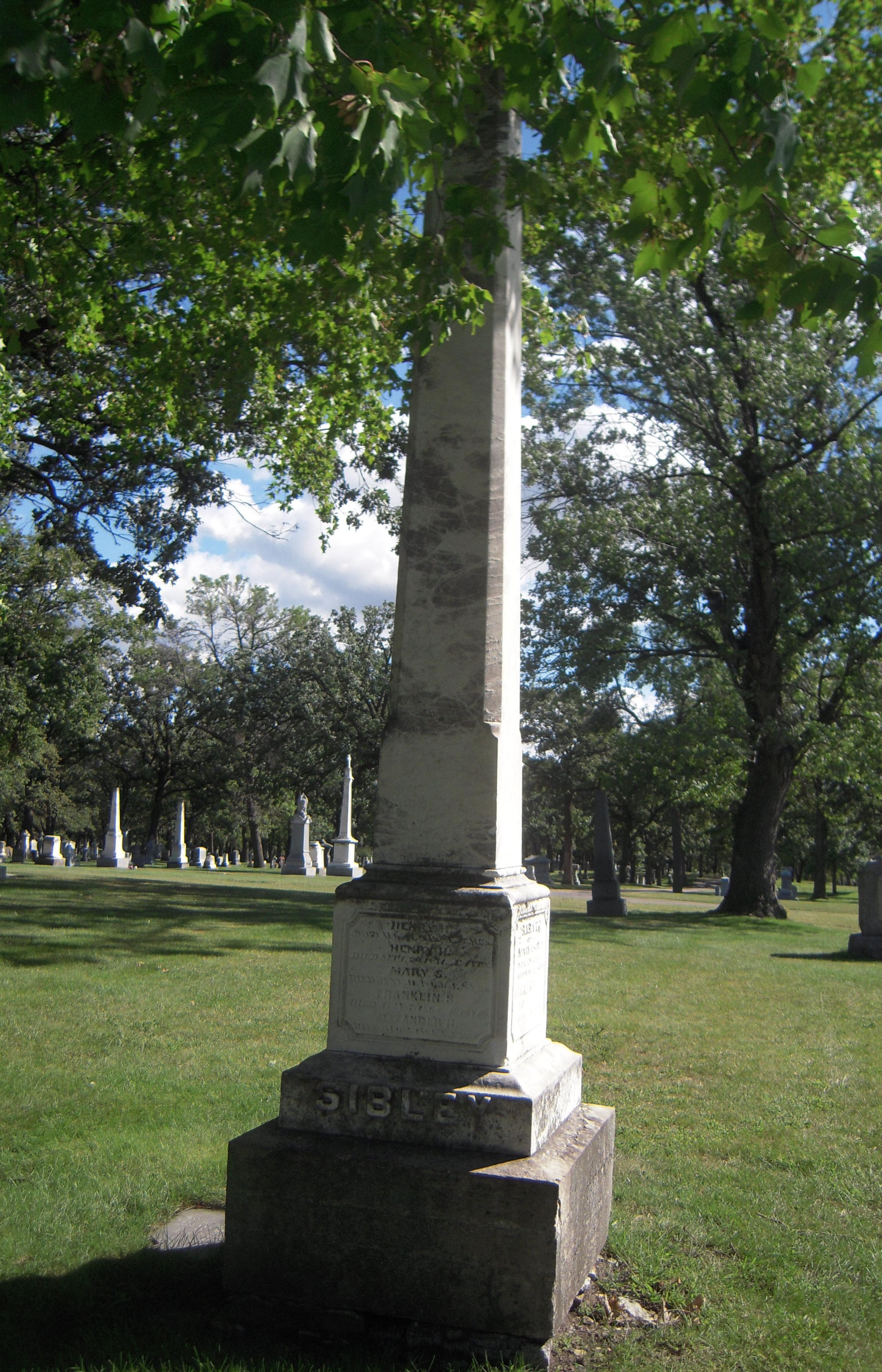
Sibley family grave column

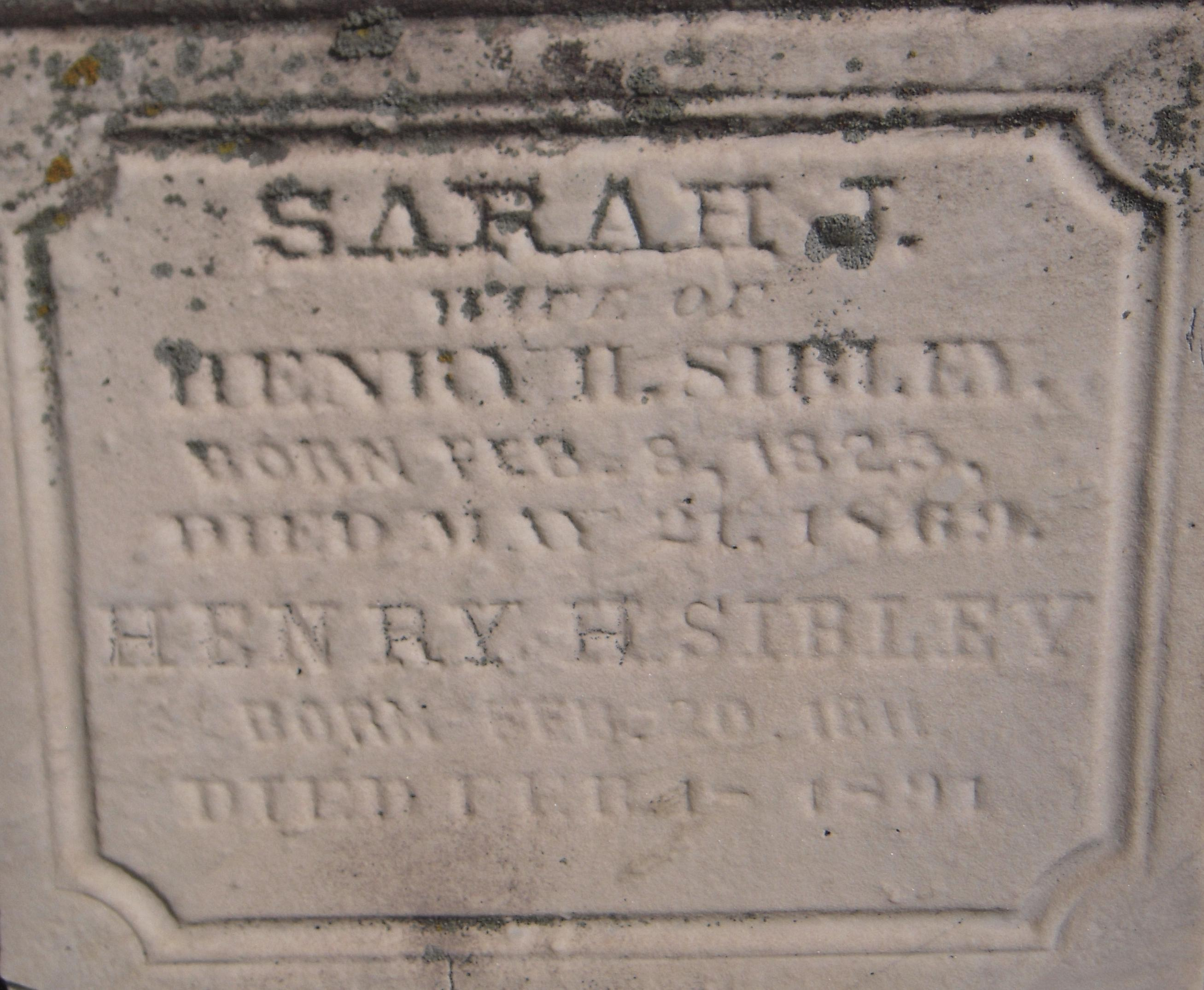
A close-up of Sibley's and wife Sarah's marker

Henry Hastings Sibley died in St. Paul, Minnesota on February 18, 1891, two days before his 80th birthday, and is buried in Oakland Cemetery in St. Paul. Historian Wilson P. Shortridge wrote, "When Sibley, in 1834, made his way into the region which became Minnesota, it was a typical fur-traders' frontier; when he died, Minnesota was a state with a population of almost one and one-half millions."

== Written works ==
Henry Hastings Sibley contributed to the collections of the Minnesota Historical Society, to Spirit of the Times, and to The Turf, Field and Farm. Among his work for the Minnesota Historical Society were memoirs of Joseph Nicolas Nicollet, Hercules L. Dousman and Jean Baptiste Faribault.

== See also ==
- List of American Civil War generals (Union)

== Notes ==
U.S. House of Representatives
Preceded by John H. Tweedy	Delegate to the U.S. House of Representatives from the Wisconsin Territory's at-large congressional district 1848–1849	Constituency abolished
New constituency	Delegate to the U.S. House of Representatives from the Minnesota Territory's at-large congressional district 1849–1853	Succeeded by Henry Rice
Party political offices
First	Democratic nominee for Governor of Minnesota; 1857	Succeeded by George Becker
Political offices
Preceded by Samuel Medary as Governor of the Minnesota Territory	Governor of Minnesota; 1858–1860	Succeeded by Alexander Ramsey
