= Fort Renville =

Historic fur-trading post

Coordinates: 45°1′56.5″N 95°52′42.5″W

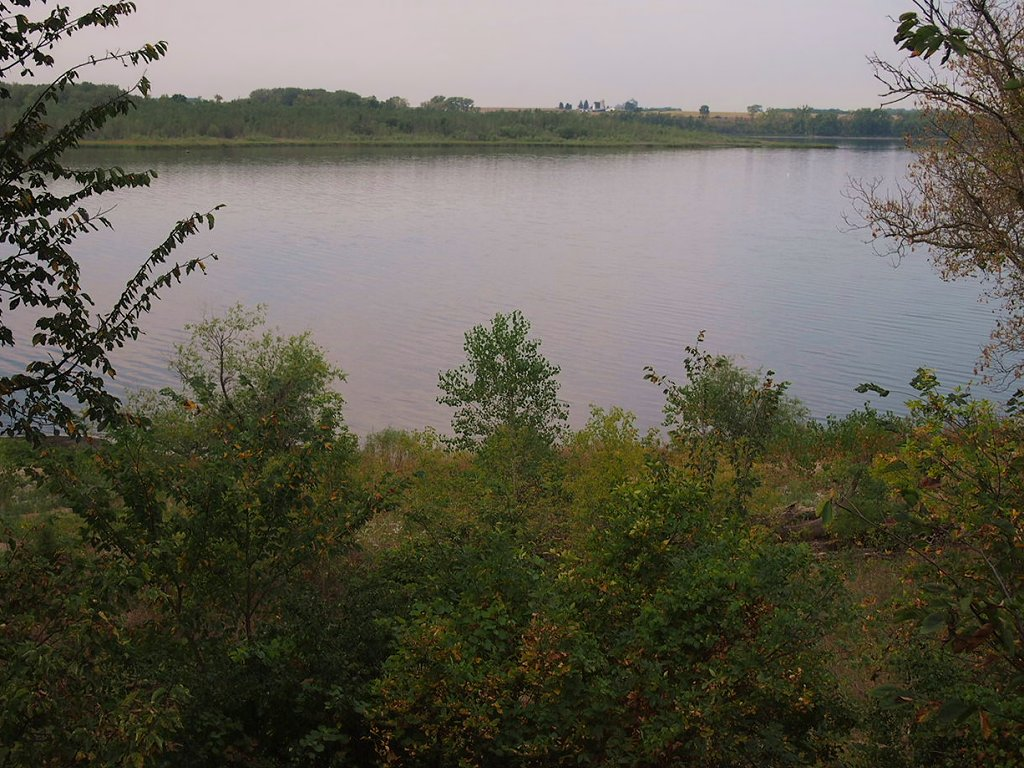
- Overlook of Fort Renville site on Lac qui Parle
- Interactive map of Fort Renville

Fort Renville, originally called Fort Adam, was a fur-trading post established by Joseph Renville and built in 1826. The fort was used as a trading post for the Columbia Fur Company, which was later purchased by the American Fur Company. The American Fur Company continued to use the post until 1846, when it moved to another site. There are no visible remains at its site, a half mile from the Lac qui Parle Mission, in Lac qui Parle State Park near Watson, Minnesota, United States. It was a significant post during the fur-trading years, but fell out of use after Renville's death in 1846. The site has been damaged by flooding and is now held in preservation by the Minnesota Historical Society. It is not open to the public. There is an overlook of the site with a sign detailing a brief history of the fur-trading post for visitors.

== Excavations ==
=== 1940 ===
In 1940, the site was partly excavated by Works Progress Administration. Only a map, four photographs, and approximately 50 artifacts remain from this work.

=== 1968 ===
A second excavation was conducted by the Minnesota Historical Society in 1968 to reexamine the previous work on the site and to complete the excavation. The remains of a palisade with a singular bastion, a watchtower, four buildings, and some trash pits were uncovered. Some of the building on the site include a trader's house, the cabin of missionary Thomas Williamson, and a storehouse.
