= General Sibley Park =

Park in Bismarck, North Dakota, United States

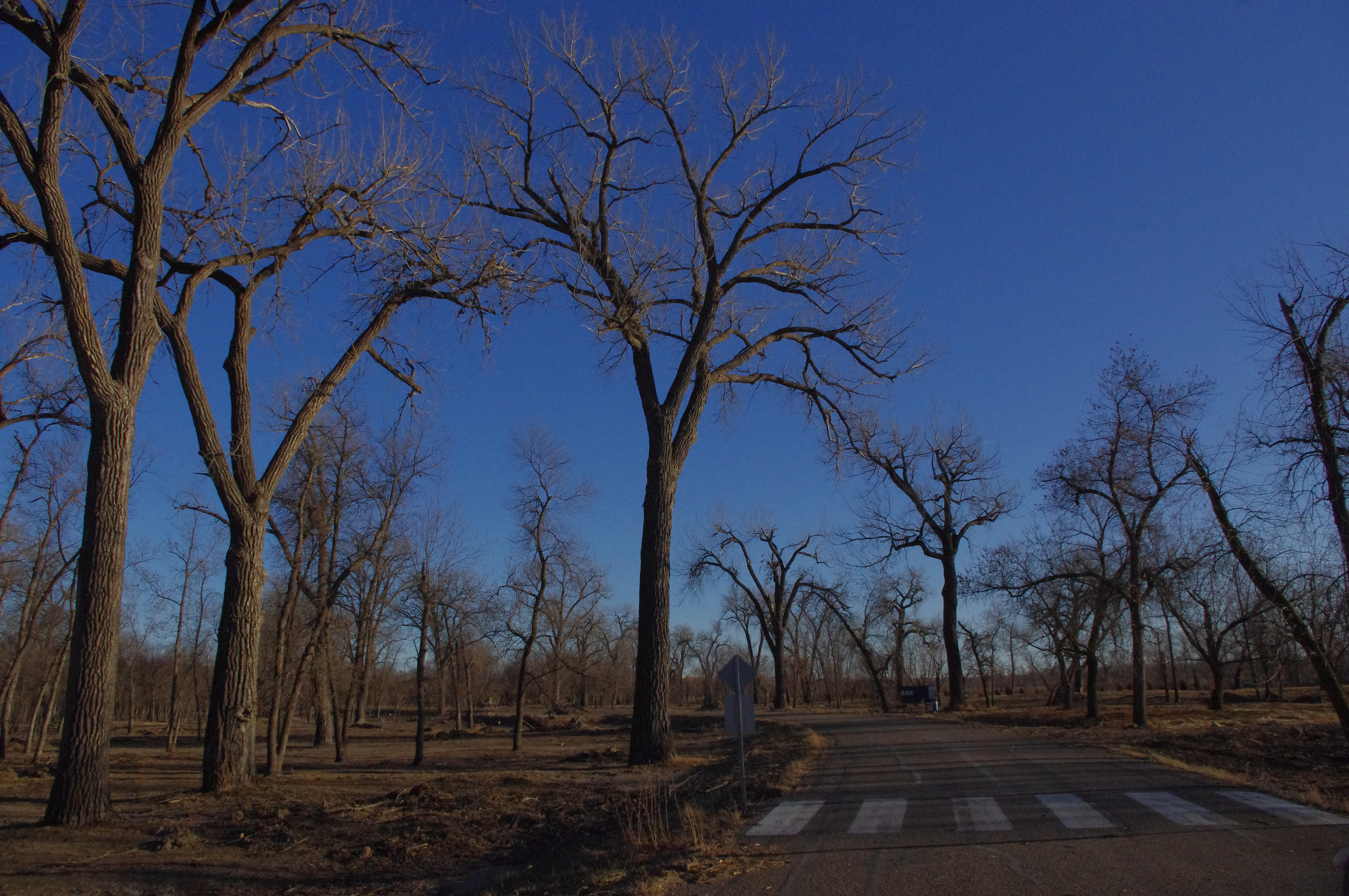
- Day use area of General Sibley Park
- Interactive map of General Sibley Park
- Nearest city: Bismarck, North Dakota
- Coordinates: 46°44′42″N 100°47′17″W
- Created: 1967
- Operator: Bismarck Parks and Recreation District
- Open: year round; camping May-Sept
- Status: public park
- Website: http://bisparks.org

Map showing park amenities

General Sibley Park is a park around 4 miles (6 km) south of Bismarck, North Dakota. Opened in 1967, it stands on a piece of land closely associated with North Dakota's history and settlement and is named after General Henry Sibley. It covers an area of 138 acres (56 ha), and the site is a popular recreation spot and campground.

== History of the site ==
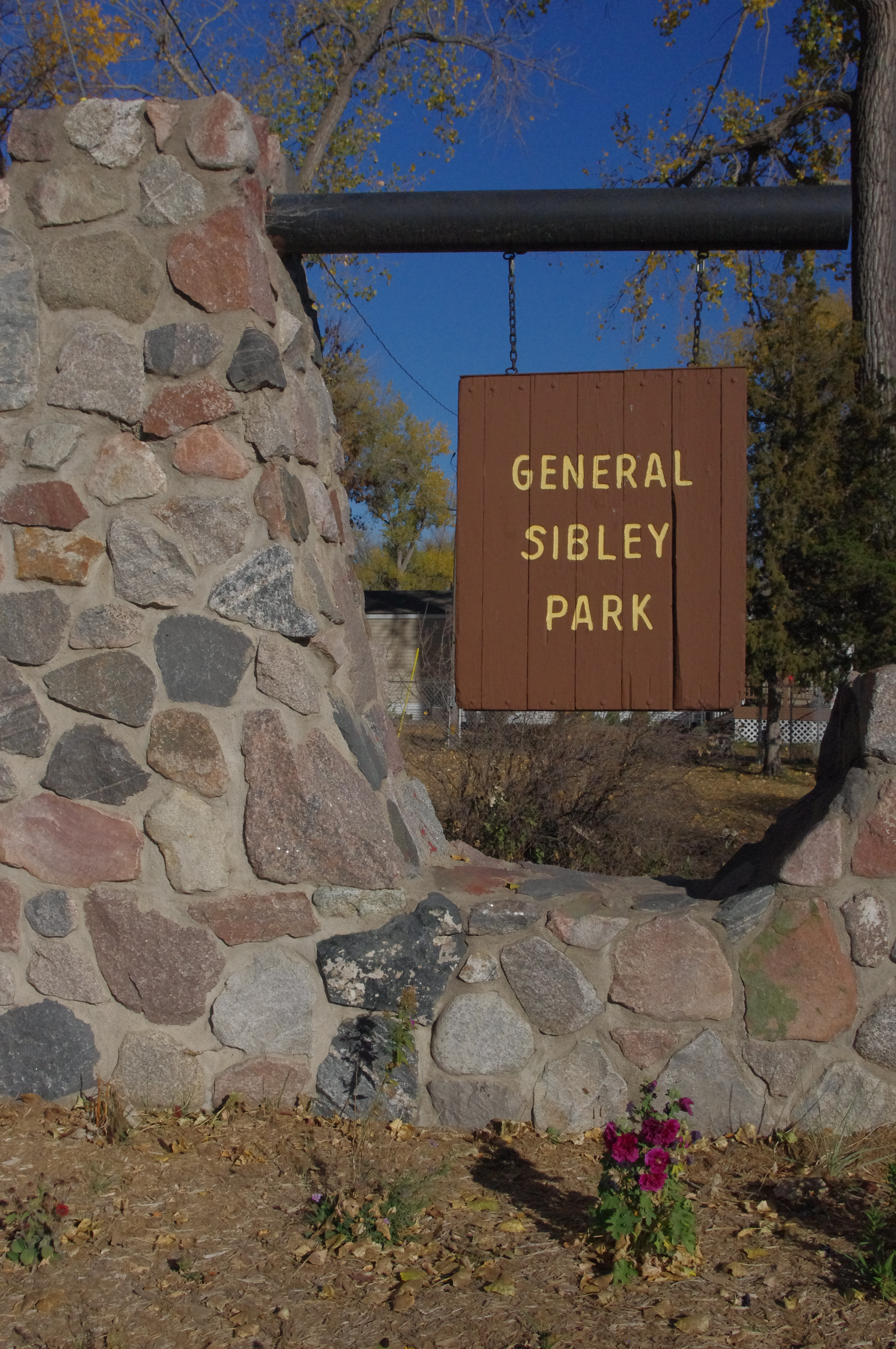
Park entrance

Once called Burnt Boat Island, the land where General Sibley Park stands was known for the steamboat The Assiniboine that grounded and was destroyed by fire in the early 1830s. While it is no longer an island due to changes in the course of the Missouri River, evidence of the river channel can still be found along the northern perimeter of the site.

In 1862, broken treaties and fear of starvation led Dakotas to attack settlers and soldiers along the Minnesota River in southwestern Minnesota. In retaliation for the loss of life and property, General Sibley and General Alfred Sully were dispatched with U.S. troops to pursue the bands assumed responsible for the assaults. Sibley and Sully sought retribution by leading their troops to the present vicinity of General Sibley Park. On July 29, 1863, Dakotas and Lakotas encamped along bluffs of the Missouri River and Apple Creek engaged in a confrontation with Sibley’s troops, resulting in a loss of lives for both sides. Facing food shortages and exhaustion from their long journey, Sibley’s troops returned to Minnesota. Sully’s troops remained in the Dakota Territory for several months, and attacked guilty and innocent bands alike, killing women and children, and burning food, supplies and transportation.

This response provided settlers with a sense of security and brought greater confidence in business and transportation development, but were devastating for the Dakotas and, as conflicts with the U.S. government continued westward and increased, tribes faced conflicts and displacement through what is collectively referred to as the Sioux Wars.

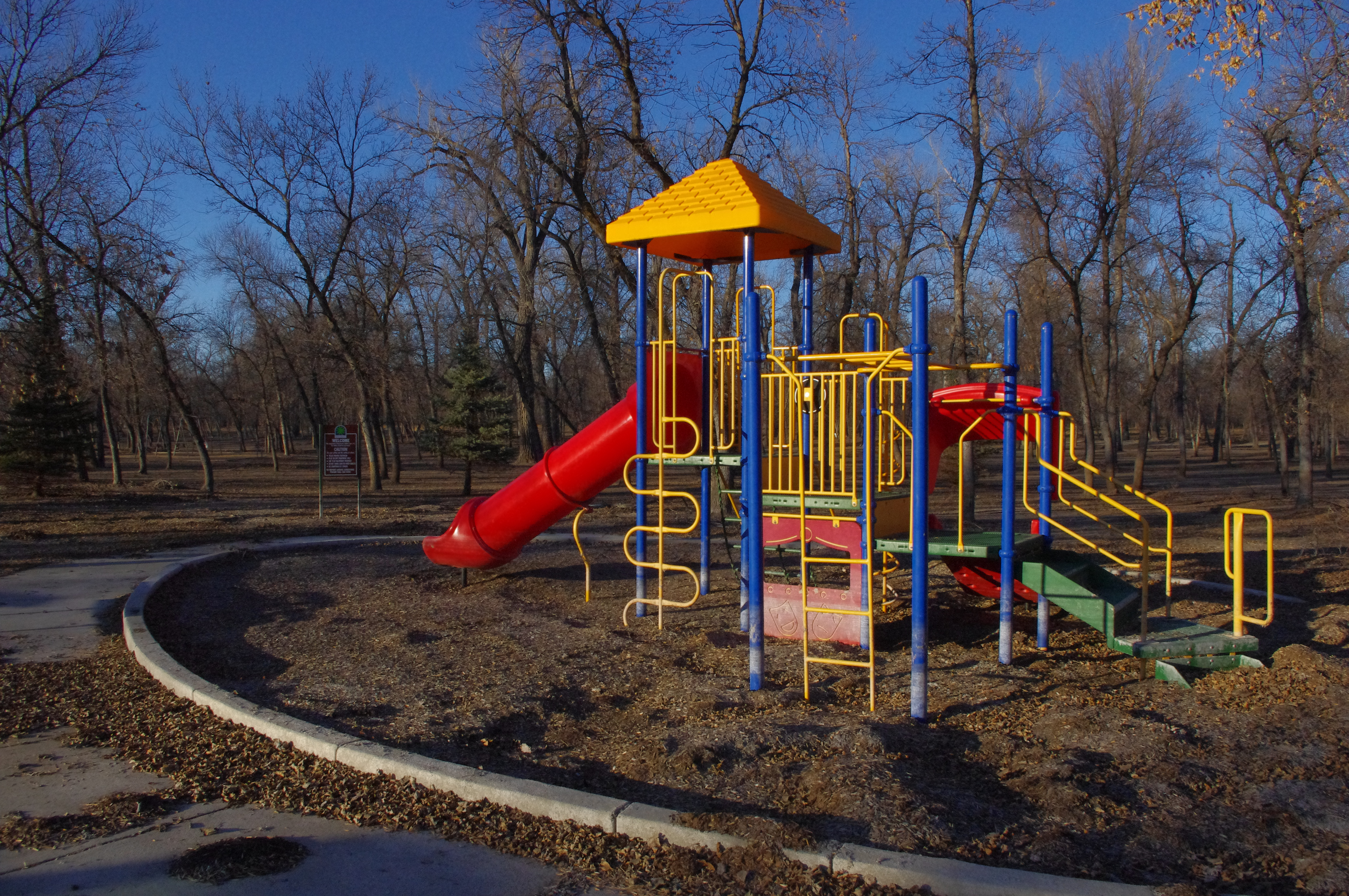
Playground, General Sibley Park

== Development of the park ==
The 138-acre area had previously been used by the Girl Scouts and Boy Scouts for activities and training, and developing the site into a more formalised recreation spot attracted strong support from conservation group the Izaak Walton League, Burleigh County and the City of Bismarck. It was officially opened as a public park on May 26, 1967.

Development of the area had also involved collaboration with the U.S. Army Corps, which still owns the site although it is managed by Bismarck Parks and Recreation District.

== General Sibley Park today ==
Also known as General Sibley Park and Campground, the area now includes 114 RV sites, a separate section for tent camping, two shower houses, and a day-use park with two picnic shelters, a volleyball court and a children's playground. There is also a 24-hole frisbee disc golf course. A boat dock is located at the south-east corner of the park.

There are some 100,000 visitors each year, with 60 per cent of them living within a radius of 20 miles (32 km) of the park, according to a 2011 report. It also attracts visitors from other states and from Canada. The vast majority of trees found in the park are green ash, with some cottonwood and boxelder.

In May 2011, the park was inundated with floodwaters from the Missouri River, with water levels reaching their peak of 19.24 feet (6 m) on July 1, 2011. Once the flood had abated, Bismarck Parks and Recreation District commissioned a visual survey of the damage caused by saturated soil conditions and wind storms. Over 1,200 trees had been toppled or partially uprooted. The report concluded that replanting should increase the diversity of tree species to reduce the losses if an insect or disease were to enter the park, and also ensure introduction of species with known tolerance of flooding. Campgrounds were closed for the season while the cleanup took place. By November 2011, around three-quarters of damaged and fallen trees had been removed by forestry crews.
