= Renville, Minnesota =

City in Minnesota, United States

Renville
- City
- Location of Renville, Minnesota
- Coordinates: 44°47′23″N 95°12′46″W
- Country: United States
- State: Minnesota
- County: Renville

Area
  - Total: 1.32 sq mi (3.42 km^{2})
  - Land: 1.32 sq mi (3.42 km^{2})
  - Water: 0 sq mi (0.00 km^{2})
- Elevation: 1,073 ft (327 m)

Population (2020)
  - Total: 1,301
  - Density: 984.7/sq mi (380.19/km^{2})
- Time zone: UTC-6 (Central (CST))
  - Summer (DST): UTC-5 (CDT)
- ZIP code: 56284
- Area code: 320
- FIPS code: 27-53890
- GNIS feature ID: 0649934
- Website: https://www.renvillemn.gov/

Renville is a city in Renville County, Minnesota, United States. The population was 1,301 at the 2020 census.

U.S. Route 212 and County Highway 6 are two of the main routes in the city.

== History ==
The city and county of Renville were named for Joseph Renville, a man of French and Dakota descent who had extensive knowledge of the wilderness and served as a guide for many expeditions. Renville founded Fort Renville and served as a captain during the War of 1812. He was a courier, interpreter, and founder of the Columbia Fur Company. He earned respect that cut across the racial and ethnic boundaries of that era.

The city of Renville was platted in 1878, when the railroad reached the area. It was incorporated in 1906. It has grown from a population of 250 in 1900 to about 1,200 residents today.

It is situated near the Minnesota River Valley in a fertile agricultural area known for its high productivity. Renville's economy, past and present, is based largely upon agribusiness. Renville serves as an agricultural service and distribution center for the surrounding area, and the city boasts the world's largest sugar beet processing plant.

== Geography ==
According to the United States Census Bureau, the city has a total area of 1.39 square miles (3.60 km^{2}), all land.

== Demographics ==
Historical population
Census	Pop.	Note	%±
1880	232		—
1890	413		78.0%
1900	1,075		160.3%
1910	1,182		10.0%
1920	1,142		−3.4%
1930	1,064		−6.8%
1940	1,256		18.0%
1950	1,323		5.3%
1960	1,373		3.8%
1970	1,252		−8.8%
1980	1,493		19.2%
1990	1,315		−11.9%
2000	1,323		0.6%
2010	1,287		−2.7%
2020	1,301		1.1%
U.S. Decennial Census

=== 2010 census ===
As of the census of 2010, there were 1,287 people, 538 households, and 316 families residing in the city. The population density was 925.9 inhabitants per square mile (357.5/km^{2}). There were 606 housing units at an average density of 436.0 per square mile (168.3/km^{2}). The racial makeup of the city was 96.8% White, 0.1% African American, 0.2% Native American, 0.3% Asian, 1.9% from other races, and 0.7% from two or more races. Hispanic or Latino of any race were 18.2% of the population.

There were 538 households, of which 27.9% had children under the age of 18 living with them, 46.1% were married couples living together, 8.6% had a female householder with no husband present, 4.1% had a male householder with no wife present, and 41.3% were non-families. 37.5% of all households were made up of individuals, and 23.8% had someone living alone who was 65 years of age or older. The average household size was 2.31 and the average family size was 3.05.

The median age in the city was 41.6 years. 24.9% of residents were under the age of 18; 7% were between the ages of 18 and 24; 21.7% were from 25 to 44; 22.6% were from 45 to 64; and 23.9% were 65 years of age or older. The gender makeup of the city was 49.0% male and 51.0% female.

== Economy ==
Agriculture is the primary business in Renville and agriculture related businesses tend to thrive there. K&M manufacturing is a prime example of an ag-related business in Renville . K&M (which stands for Kleinhuizen and Mulder after founders Nicholas Kleinhuizen and "Muff" Mulder) manufactures tractor seats and ag-related items. Multiple US patent holders either have resided in Renville or have grown up in Renville, including employees of K&M, plus residents Niclas Wolterstorff, Dan Schemel and Richard Fredrickson.
