= Hypolite Dupuis =

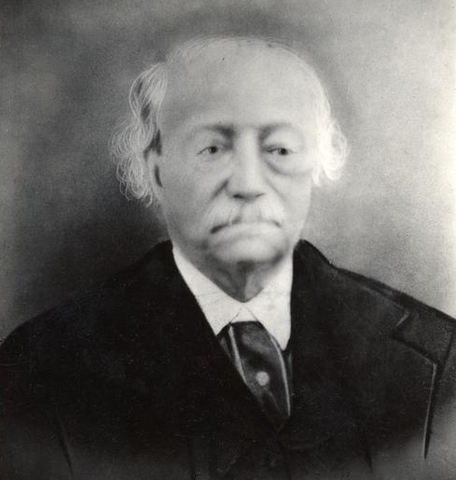
- Born: October 1804; La Prairie de la Madeleine (near Montreal, Canada)
- Died: July 1879 (aged 74); Mendota, Minnesota
- Spouse: Angelique Agathe Renville Dupuis (1815–1890)

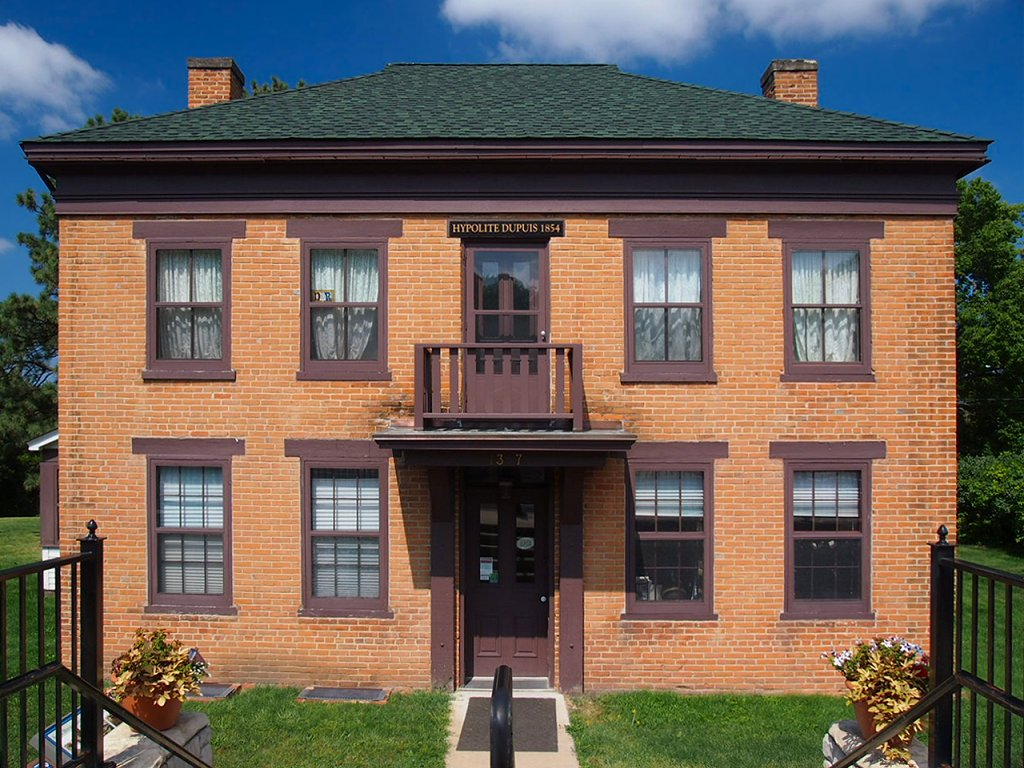
House built by Hypolite Dupuis

Hypolite Dupuis (October 16, 1804 – July 1879) was known as a "veritable old settler" in the Minnesota River Valley when it was largely inhabited by Native Americans. He was a French Canadian fur trader who eventually settled in Mendota, Minnesota, opened the first general store there, and served as the first treasurer of Dakota County.

== Early life, career and family ==
During the early part of his life, Dupuis worked as fur trader with the American Fur Company. He was born in La Prairie de la Madeleine, near present-day Montreal in lower Canada.

By 1831, he had moved to what was then Michigan Territory, but would later become Wisconsin Territory and Minnesota Territory, to work at Joseph Renville’s Lac qui Parle trading post. He married Angelique Agathe Renville, eldest daughter of Joseph Renville and Mary Tokanne (a Dakota noblewoman and early Christian convert). Hypolite and Angelique's wedding at Lac qui Parle in 1838 was attended by missionary Stephen Return Riggs, and was later recorded as a Protestant marriage by Monsignor Augustin Ravoux.

They had eight children, and also raised a Métis orphan, Louise Allard.

== Business relationship with Henry Sibley ==
Hypolite Dupuis moved to Mendota, Minnesota around 1840 and lived with his family in a small cabin on the property of Henry Hastings Sibley.

Dupuis worked as a bookkeeper and then a business partner of Sibley, who later became the first governor of the state of Minnesota.

In 1848, Dupuis naturalized as an American citizen around the time that Henry Sibley was elected as the at-large Congressional district representative for the Wisconsin Territory.

The fur trade had largely died out by the 1850s, and Sibley and Dupuis liquidated their fur trade interests in 1853.

In 1854, Dupuis built a two-story home made of Wisconsin brick, and operated the first general store and grocery in Mendota from the main floor. He closed the store during the Panic of 1857. The house is now part of the Sibley House Historic Site.

== Public service in Mendota ==
Hypolite Dupuis was active in the Mendota community, serving as Dakota County's first treasurer in 1854, the justice of the peace in 1855, and as the Mendota postmaster from 1854 to 1863.

Although Dupuis is known to have been fluent in French, English and Patois [Michif, the language of the Métis or Half-Breeds], one lawyer recalled that he once lost a case adjudicated by Dupuis because he had argued his case vigorously in English and was poorly understood by Dupuis, whereas the opposing party was able to present its case and answer questions in French.

Hypolite's brother Michael Dupuis moved to Mendota in 1854, and served as school clerk for ten years and as deputy sheriff for three years.

== After the Dakota War ==
In 1871, Dupuis sold his brick home to Timothy Fee, and moved to the Devil’s Lake Reservation in North Dakota to work as storekeeper for the Fort Totten Indian Agency. He also briefly re-entered the fur trade. The Indian Agent for the reservation was William Henry Forbes, a former employee of Henry Sibley.

By 1879, Dupuis had moved back to Minnesota, where he died at the age of 74.
