= Joseph Renville =

Dakota translator and fur trader (1779–1846)

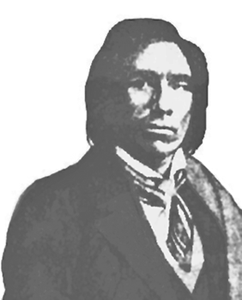
- Born: Joseph Renville; 1779; Kaposia village
- Died: March 18, 1846 (aged 66–67); Minnesota
- Citizenship: American (naturalized)
- Spouse: Mary Tokanne Renville (1789–1840)

Joseph Renville (1779–1846) was an interpreter, translator, expedition guide, Canadian officer in the War of 1812, founder of the Columbia Fur Company, and an important figure in dealings between settlers of European ancestry and Dakota (Sioux) Natives in Minnesota. He contributed to the translation of Christian religious texts into the Dakota language. The hymnal Dakota dowanpi kin, was "composed by J. Renville and sons, and the missionaries of the A.B.C.F.M." and was published in Boston in 1842. Its successor, Dakota Odowan, first published with music in 1879, has been reprinted many times and is in use today.

Joseph Renville's father, Joseph Rainville (also known as De Rainville) (1753–1806), was a French Canadian canoeman and fur trader, and his mother, Miniyuhe (Miniyuhewiŋ), was a kinswoman of the Mdewakanton Dakota chief Little Crow family. Renville's bicultural formative years probably included instruction by a Roman Catholic priest in Eastern Canada. His wife, Mary Tokanne (Tokahewiŋ) Renville, also a kinswoman of Big Thunder (Wakiŋyaŋtaŋka) Little Crow II, was an early Christian convert.

The town of Renville, Minnesota, is named in honor of Joseph Renville, as are Renville County, Minnesota and Renville County, North Dakota. A street in Detroit, Michigan is also named after him.

== Expeditions and War of 1812 ==
In 1805, Renville was appointed by the U.S. as an interpreter on the recommendation of officer Zebulon Pike during his expedition to explore the upper northern reaches of the Louisiana Purchase.

During the War of 1812, he was appointed by Colonel Robert Dickson as a captain in the British army leading a group of Dakota soldiers. He was present at the Siege of Fort Meigs in 1813 as well as the Siege of Prairie du Chien in 1814. Following the war, he lived for a short period in Canada and received the pay of a retired British captain.

He also guided the U.S. expedition in 1823 to Red River of the North led by Major Stephen Harriman Long.

== Fur trading ==
Joseph Renville was descended from a long line of French Canadian voyageurs in the fur trade, including his great-grandfather Charles de Rainville (b. 1668) who was active in the peltry trade in Montréal from 1704; his grandfather, Pierre Joseph de Rainville (b. 1713), who started out as a voyageur for Thierry and Company of Montréal and "winter[ed] for a year at Poste des Sioux on the shores of the Upper Mississippi"; and his father, Joseph Rainville (1753–1806), who came to the upper Minnesota valley as a fur trader in the 1780s and joined a commercial trading brigade formed by Robert Dickson.

As a young man, Joseph Renville got his own start as a fur trader prior to the War of 1812, when he was hired by Robert Dickson as a "coureur des bois" for a British fur company.

Sometime after the war, he entered into the service of the Hudson's Bay Company at the head of the Red River, where he remained until 1822. He eventually naturalized as an American citizen, relinquishing his British officer's pension, so he could maintain his trading post which was on U.S. soil.

Following the merger of the Hudson's Bay Company with the North West Company, Joseph Renville formed the Columbia Fur Company with a group of other traders. Their company was so successful that its rival, the American Fur Company founded by John Jacob Astor, reported that the Columbia Fur Company did its business "an annual injury of ten thousand dollars at least."

In 1827, American Fur Company bought out the Columbia Fur Company, but retained the "coureurs des bois." Subsequently, Renville's business dealings with the American Fur Company brought him into contact with Henry Hastings Sibley, who took charge of the company's operations in the upper Mississippi Valley in 1834.

== Stockade and soldiers' lodge ==
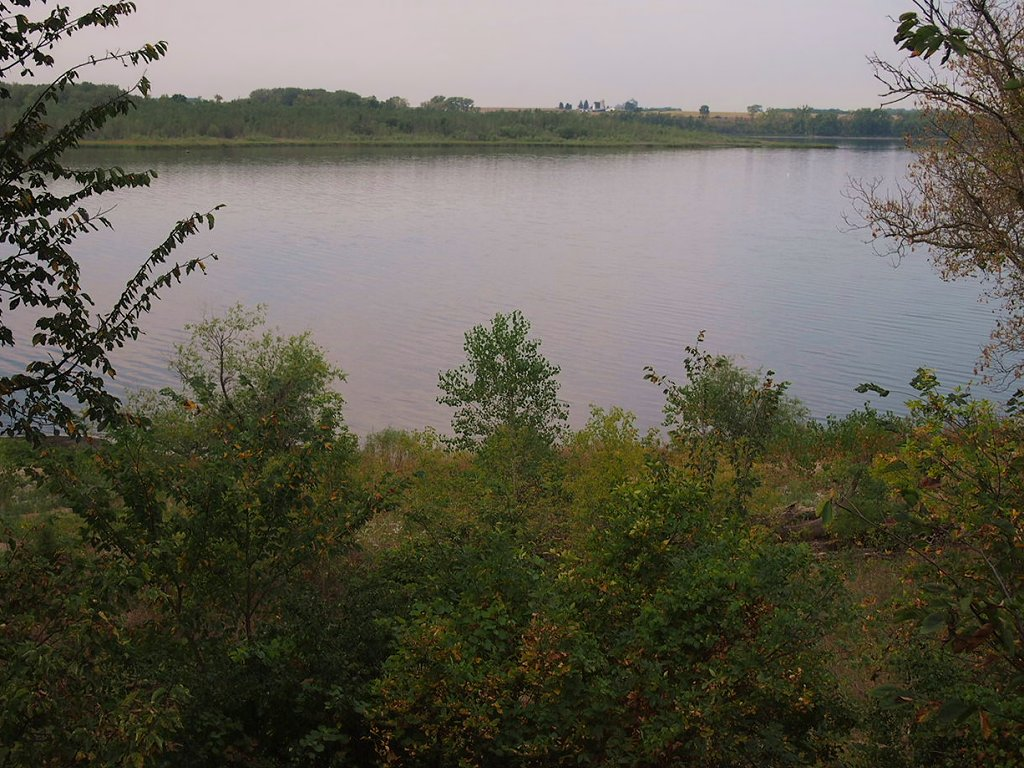
Lac qui Parle view from Fort Renville site

In 1826, Joseph Renville settled in Lac qui Parle, Minnesota. There, he built a stockade, established a soldiers' lodge, and continued his livelihood as a fur trader.

Although soldiers' lodges were usually temporary setups for buffalo or deer hunts, in 1830 Joseph Renville organized a more permanent lodge (or akacita) at Lac qui Parle. Led by Joseph's younger brother Victor Renville (Ohiya), his brother-in-law Left Hand (Catka), and a Wahpeton named Akipa, Renville's soldiers controlled hunts and protected hunters from neighboring tribes competing for access to prime hunting grounds.

In 1832, Victor Renville was ambushed and killed by a group of Ojibwe, as he was leading a group of soldiers back from a revenge attack and raid on an American Fur Company trading house. Following the death of his brother, Joseph Renville organized war parties to retaliate, leading to "a full-scale Indian war rag[ing] east of Lac qui Parle," and growing concern among U.S. government officials about Renville's power and influence in the region.

== Mission and school at Lac qui Parle ==
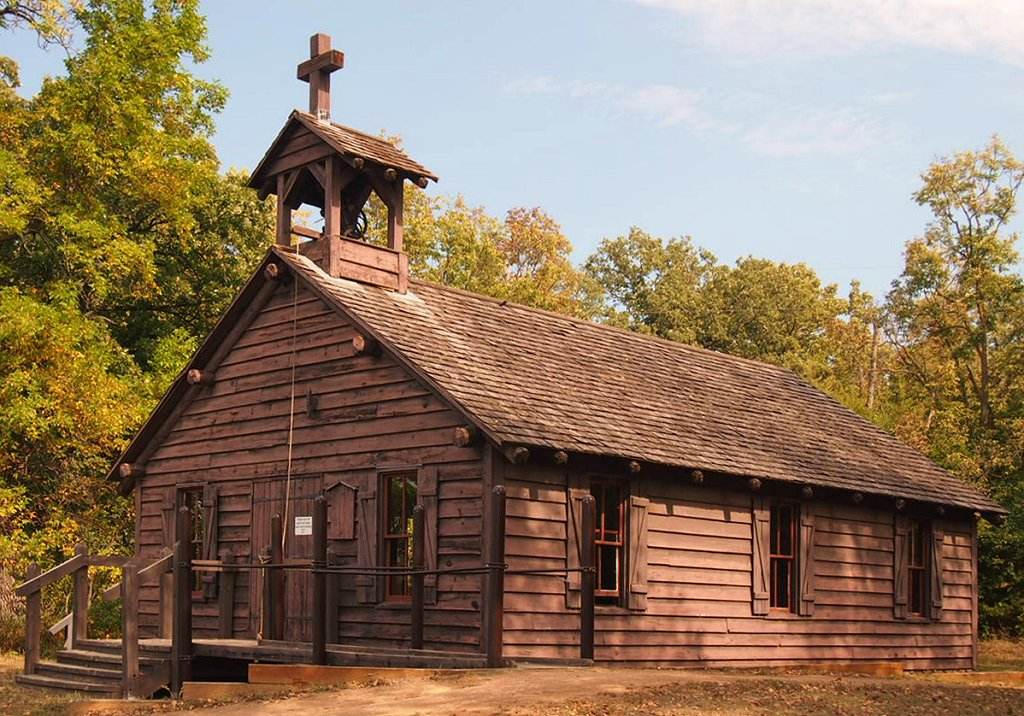
Lac qui Parle Mission (reconstructed)

In 1835, Indian agent Lawrence Taliaferro suggested to Thomas Smith Williamson, M.D. (1800–1879) that he set up a mission at Lac qui Parle; Dr. Williamson agreed after learning that Renville would welcome the missionaries if they also taught his children in school.

Another missionary, Stephen Return Riggs (1812–1883) arrived at Lac qui Parle Mission in 1837. Two others, Gideon Hollister Pond (1810–1878) and his brother Samuel William Pond (1808–1891) were largely responsible for the creation of the written Dakota alphabet.

In the early years, Renville "allowed the missionaries to use the tepee headquarters of the soldiers' lodge as a church." Joseph and Mary Renville, who had been married in the Dakota tradition in 1806 and in the Catholic Church in 1829, were converted to Protestantism along with several children in 1836. Several of their female Dakota relatives joined a year later.

Although the mission was less successful in converting Dakota men (because the missionaries required them to reject polygamy), there were a handful of men who attended church and school at Lac qui Parle Mission regularly over the years, including Taoyatetuda, Mary Renville's kinsman, who would later return to Kaposia to take over as Chief Little Crow.

== Bible translation into Dakota ==
Joseph Renville and the missionaries translated books of The Bible into the Dakota language. Renville's French Bible, printed in Geneva, Switzerland, in 1588, was used for translating.

Riggs wrote that the little group of translators "usually consisted of Mr. Renville, who sat in a chair in the middle of his own reception room, in which there was at one end an open fireplace with a large blazing fire, and Dr. Williamson, Mr. G. H. Pond, and myself, seated at a side-table with our writing materials before us. When all were ready, Dr. Williamson read a verse from the French Bible. This, Mr. Renville, usually with great readiness, repeated in the Dakota language. We wrote it down from his mouth. If the sentence was too long for us to remember, Mr. Renville repeated it... That winter, the Gospel of Mark was finished..."

In 1836, Renville employed a clerk named Eugene Gauss (1811–1896), who, during his service as a private in the United States Army, had become "a pious Presbyterian and decided he wanted to be a missionary." Gauss assisted with translation of the Bible from French into Dakota, and Dr. Williamson wrote, "Brother Gauss, Mr. R's present clerk being pious and feeling a deep interest in the spiritual welfare of the Dakotas and my own increasing knowledge of the French language make it more practicable to give religious instruction than heretofore." Eugene Gauss was a son of the renowned German mathematician and physicist, Carl Friedrich Gauss.

== Three Dakota Native Airs ==
Dakota Odowan Hymn Book

Three of the hymn tunes in Dakota Odowan are designated as Dakota Native Airs. While an examination of distinctive meters and other evidence suggests Joseph Renville may have composed the tunes, it is certain he composed the three Dakota hymn texts. The tune names are LACQUIPARLE (number 141), LA FRAMBOISE (number 142), and RENVILLE (number 145).

The first of these appears in many modern hymnals and is probably the world's most widely known melody of North American Indigenous origin. The complete text and tune were first published in the 1879 edition of the Dakota Odowan with a four-part harmonization in D-minor written by James R. Murray. In modern English-language hymnals, a paraphrased translation of Dakota Odowan 141 by Philip Frazier, loosely based on Renville's text, appears with the tune LACQUIPARLE, and it is known to many Christians by the opening words, "Many and great, O God, are thy works, maker of earth and sky". Glover, Raymond (1994). The Hymnal 1982 Companion: Volume Three B. New York: The Church Hymnal Corporation. pp. 719–724.

The hymn tune RENVILLE has been adapted for modern congregational singing in Singing the New Testament, a hymnal copublished in 2008 by The Calvin Institute of Christian Worship and Faith Alive Christian Resources.

== Family legacy ==
The Renville family was considered "one of the most preeminent French-Sioux families in the upper Mississippi region" in the nineteenth century.

Joseph and Mary Renville of Lac qui Parle encouraged their eight children to read and write in both Dakota and English. Many of them went on to forge further ties in fur trading society, in Sioux kinship networks and in Christian missionary circles, and contributed to the preservation of Dakota language, history and culture.

Their four daughters studied in an English class taught first by Sarah Poage (who became Mrs. Gideon Hollister Pond) and later by Mary Riggs, wife of Stephen Return Riggs. Their eldest daughter Angelique Agathe Renville married French Canadian fur trader Hypolite Dupuis, who was employed by Joseph Renville at Lac qui Parle in 1830, and later settled in Mendota, Minnesota.

Joseph and Mary's son Michel Renville was educated at the Lac qui Parle mission school and later wrote down Dakota legends that were translated into English, such as "Wićaŋḣpi Hiŋḣpaya; or, The Fallen Star," which was published in Stephen R. Riggs's work Dakota Grammar, Texts and Ethnology (1893).

Their youngest daughter, Marguerite Renville, taught most of the classes at the mission school in Kaposia when the American Board missionaries were invited to settle there in 1846 by Taoyateduta, Chief Little Crow.

Their youngest son, Rev. John Baptiste Renville, translated "Precept Upon Precept," which became a school text for Dakota children. He was the first Dakota pastor to be ordained by the Dakota Presbytery and served as the pastor of Ascension Church on the Sisseton and Wahpeton Reservation in South Dakota for 30 years.

Joseph Renville helped to look after his nephew, Gabriel Renville, after his brother Victor (Ohiya) Renville was killed in 1832. Gabriel Renville was a driving force within the Dakota Peace Party during the Dakota War of 1862, and served as the leader of the Dakota scouts for three years. He went on to become Chief of the Sisseton Wahpeton Oyate Sioux Tribe, overseeing the creation and settlement of the Lake Traverse Reservation.

== Clarification ==
There has been considerable confusion among historians and genealogists about Joseph Renville's family history. Joseph Renville of Lac qui Parle had a father, son and grandson who were also named Joseph; some historical accounts designate Joseph of Lac qui Parle himself as "Jr." whereas others have attached the "Jr." to his son (1809–1856).

Perhaps the greatest source of confusion is that Akipa, a full-blood Dakota of the Wahpeton band (with no direct relation to the French Canadian Renville/Rainville family or the Mdewakanton), greatly admired Joseph Renville of Lac qui Parle and adopted his English name in tribute. As a result, some researchers have incorrectly assumed that they were the same person.

Joseph Renville of Lac qui Parle and Akipa were, however, related indirectly through Akipa's marriage in about 1835 or 1836 to Winona Crawford, the widow of Joseph's brother Victor Renville, which made Joseph Akipa Renville the stepfather of Joseph Renville's nephew Gabriel.

Long after the death of Joseph Renville of Lac qui Parle in 1846, Joseph Akipa Renville (c. 1810–1891), son of Buffalo Man, was part of the Sisseton-Wahpeton delegation to Washington, DC in 1858, and famously rescued the mixed-blood family of former Indian agent Joseph R. Brown during the Dakota War of 1862.
