= Fox-Wisconsin Portage Site =

- U.S. National Register of Historic Places
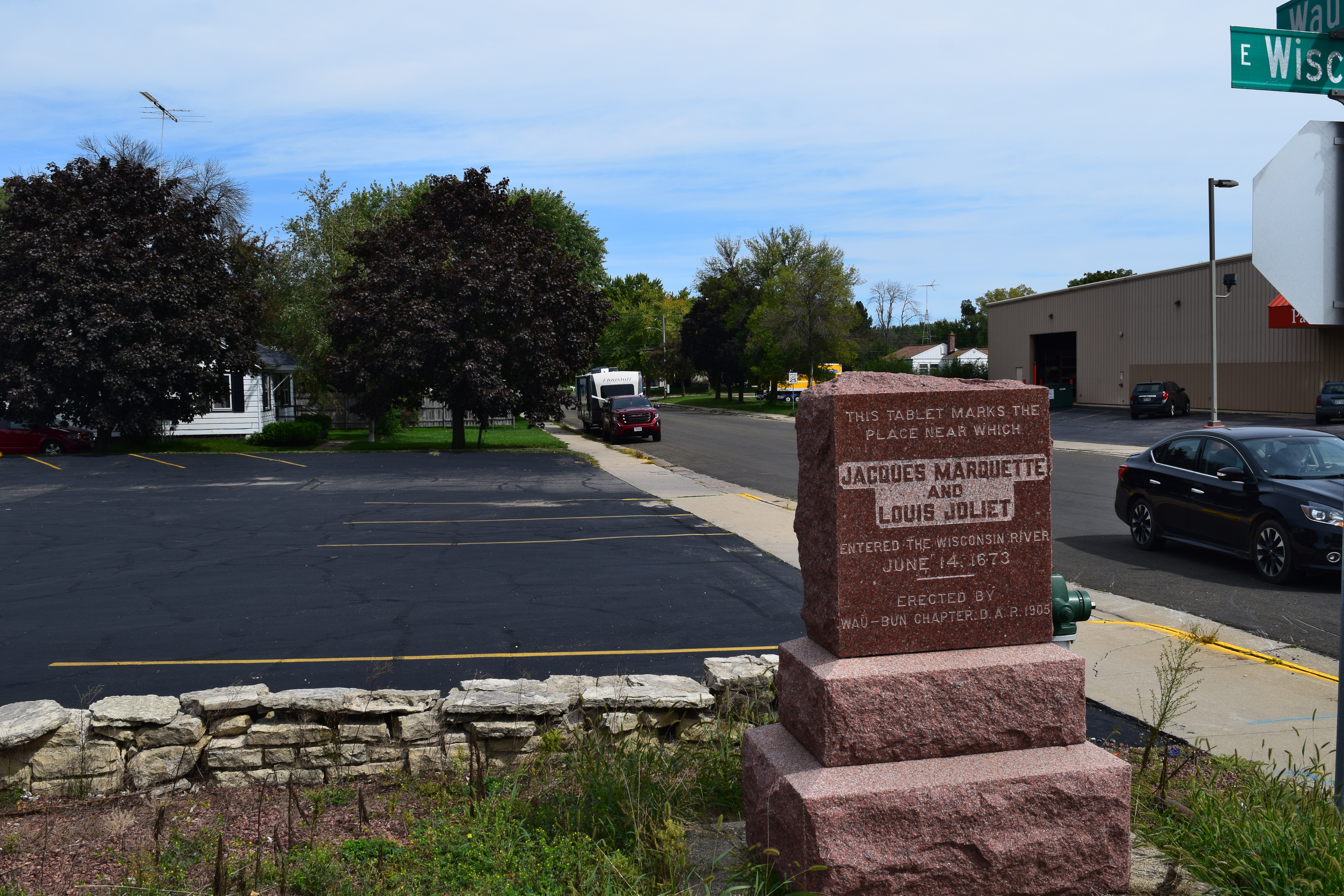
- Historical marker at the site
- Location: Portage, Wisconsin
- Area: 12.5 acres (5.1 ha)
- NRHP reference No.: 73000074
- Added to NRHP: March 14, 1973

The Fox-Wisconsin Portage Site is located in Portage, Wisconsin.

== History ==
The site is a two-mile crossing from the upper Fox river to the Wisconsin and Mississippi, used by Native Americans, French fur traders, Marquette and Jolliet, and British soldiers, before there were roads or railroads through Wisconsin. It was added to the National Register of Historic Places in 1973.
