= Lac qui Parle Mission =

- Lac qui Parle Mission Archeological Historic District
- U.S. National Register of Historic Places
- Minnesota State Register of Historic Places
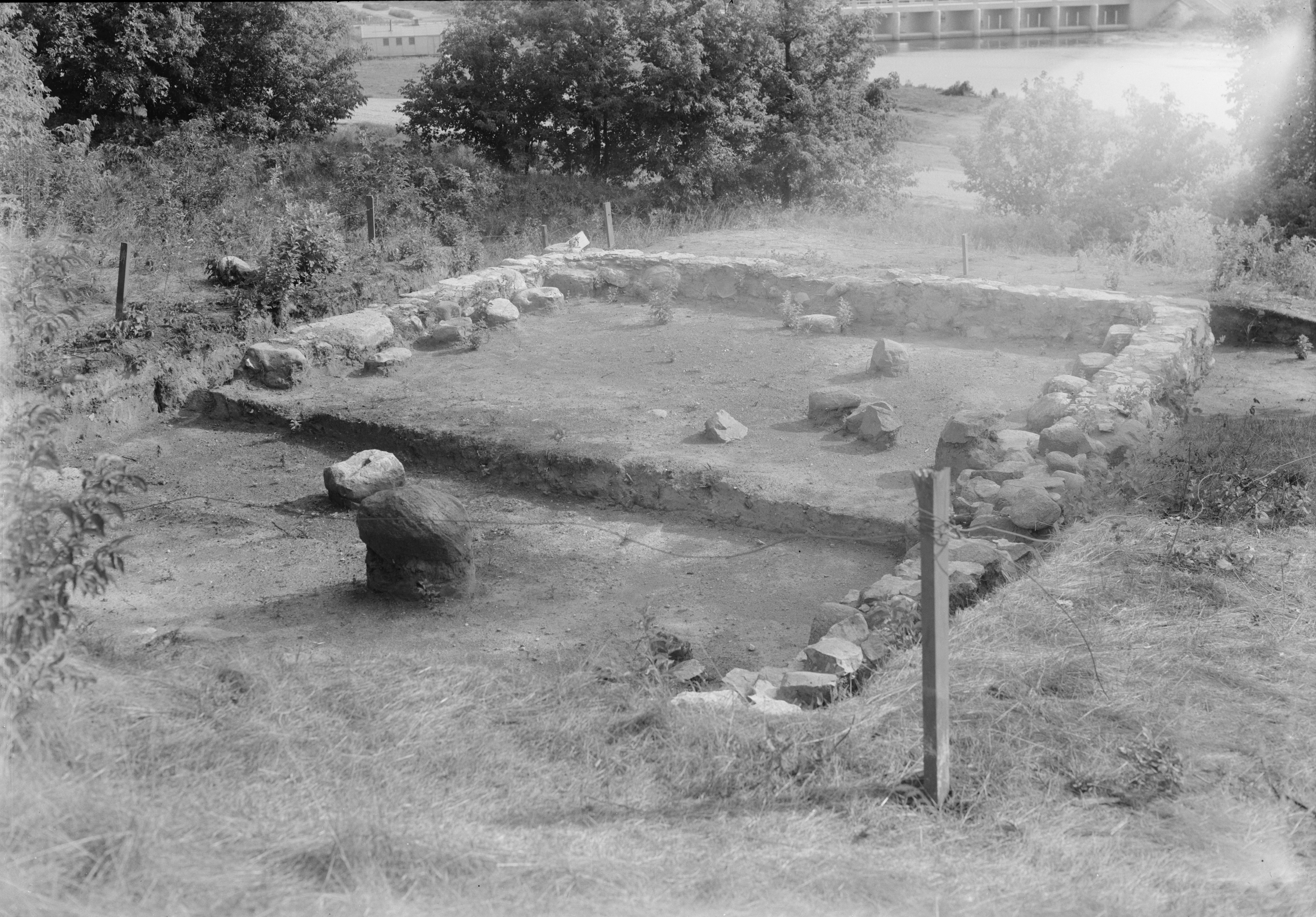
- Lac Qui Parle Mission Church (Ruins)
- Location: Lac qui Parle County / Chippewa County
- Nearest city: Watson, Minnesota
- Coordinates: 45.023722°N 95.868194°W
- NRHP reference No.: 73000971
- Added to NRHP: March 14, 1973

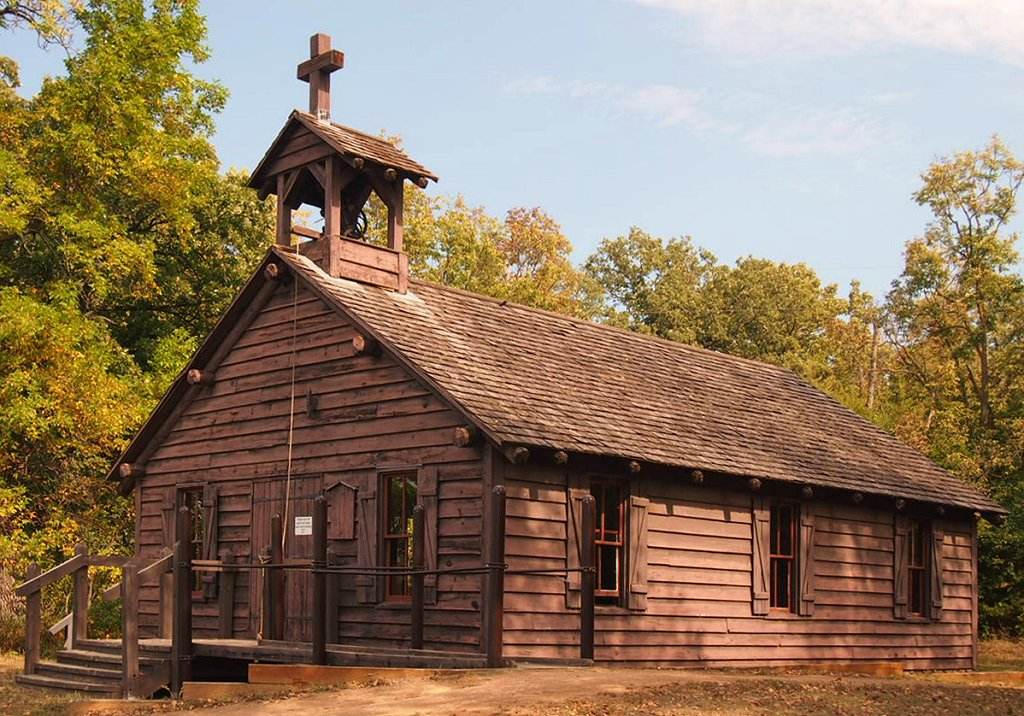
The reconstructed Lac qui Parle Mission

Lac qui Parle Mission is a pre-territorial mission in Chippewa County, Minnesota, United States, which was founded in June 1835 by Dr. Thomas Smith Williamson and Alexander Huggins after fur trader Joseph Renville invited missionaries to the area. "Lac qui Parle" is the French translation of the native Dakota name, "Mde Iyedan," meaning "lake which speaks". In the 19th century, the first dictionary of the Dakota language was written, and part of the Bible was translated into that language for the first time at a mission on the site of the park. It was a site for Christian missionary work to the Dakota for nearly 20 years. Renville was related to and had many friends in the Native community, and after his death in 1846, the mission was taken over by the "irreligious" Martin McLeod. The relationship between the mission and the Dakota people worsened, and in 1854 the missionaries abandoned the site and relocated to the Upper Sioux Agency.

The mission was reconstructed by the Works Progress Administration in 1942 and is now managed by the Chippewa County Historical Society in partnership with the Minnesota Historical Society.

== Fort Renville ==
The Lac qui Parle Mission site is also home to the remains of Fort Renville, the fortified home and trading post established in 1826 by explorer and fur trader Joseph Renville. The fort comprised two dwellings and a storehouse, surrounded by a stockade and protected by a bastion and watchtower. Located a half mile from the mission site, the fort was a significant outpost in southwestern Minnesota, and was a stopping point for traders on the Red River Trails. It fell into disuse after Renville's death in 1846.

The site was excavated in 1940 and is now held in preservation by the Minnesota Historical Society. It is not open to the public.
