= Lac qui Parle State Park =

- Lac qui Parle State Park WPA/Rustic Style Historic District
- U.S. National Register of Historic Places
- U.S. Historic district
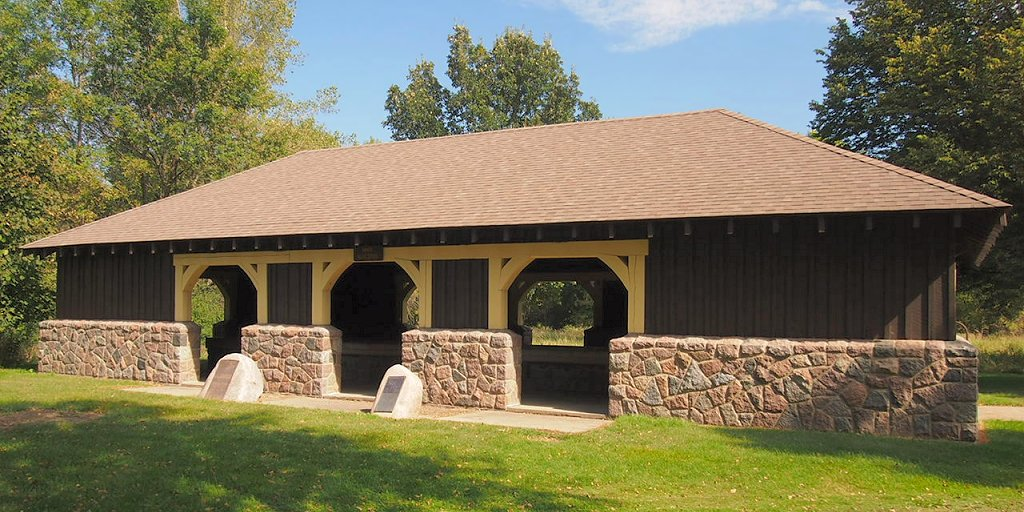
- Lac qui Parle map shelter

- Location within Minnesota Location within the United States
- Location: Off Co. Hwy. 33 at SE end of Lac qui Parle, Lac qui Parle Township
- Nearest city: Montevideo, Minnesota
- Coordinates: 45°1′17″N 95°53′11″W
- MPS: Minnesota State Park CCC/WPA/Rustic Style MPS
- NRHP reference No.: 91001055
- Added to NRHP: August 19, 1991

Lac qui Parle State Park is a state park of Minnesota, United States, near Watson. Lac qui Parle is a French translation of the native Dakota name, Bde Iyedaƞ, meaning "lake that speaks".

The state park was built as part of the Lac qui Parle Flood Control Project. Lac qui Parle itself is a widening of the Minnesota River, and the flood control project involved building a dam at the south end of the lake. The dam was constructed by the Works Progress Administration, and other projects were built along the lake. Besides the dam and the state park, other projects included the Watson Wayside, Lac qui Parle Parkway, and the reconstruction of the Lac qui Parle Mission. Three structures are included in the National Register of Historic Places, including the Model Shelter, which houses a relief map (cast in reinforced concrete) of the Lac qui Parle Flood Control System and the Minnesota River Valley; the kitchen shelter; and the sanitation building.
