= George Bonga =

Ojibwe-African American fur trader and interpreter

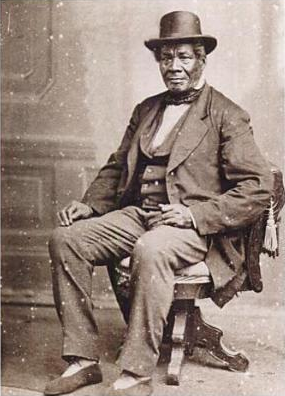
- African American and Ojibwe
- Born: August 20, 1802; Northwest Territory near modern Duluth
- Died: 1874; Onigum, Minnesota
- Occupations: Fur trader Government interpreter Entrepreneur

George Bonga (August 20, 1802 – 1874) was a fur trader, entrepreneur and interpreter for the U.S. government, who was of Ojibwe and African descent, fluent in French, Ojibwemowin and English. At the age of eighteen, he served as an interpreter for Governor Lewis Cass of Michigan Territory during a treaty council with the Ojibwe at Fond du Lac near present-day Duluth, Minnesota. Bonga worked for the American Fur Company from 1820 to 1839, progressing to the role of clerk or sub-trader working under the head trader William Alexander Aitken. In 1837, he was involved in the first criminal trial held in Minnesota when he tracked down and successfully apprehended Che-ga-wa-skung, an Ojibwe man who was wanted for murder, transporting him 250 miles (400 km) back to Fort Snelling.

In the 1850s, Bonga worked for the United States Indian agent at Leech Lake, serving as interpreter and superintendent of the government farm. Later, he traded in dry goods and opened a lodge on Leech Lake with his wife. In 1867, Bonga served as an interpreter during treaty negotiations which resulted in the creation of the White Earth Indian Reservation.

Baptized Catholic and educated in Montreal, George Bonga was the son of Pierre Bonga, a Black man who worked in the fur trade, and an Ojibwe mother, Ogibwayquay, and the brother of Stephen Bonga and Margaret Bonga Fahlstrom. George and his Ojibwe wife, Ashwewin, had four children, including William Bonga, who joined the followers of Waabaanakwad at White Earth.

Bungo Township in Cass County, Minnesota is named after the Bonga family. George Bonga was featured in the "Black American Pioneers" exhibit at the National Great Blacks In Wax Museum and was mentioned in the United States Congressional Record during the introduction of the National Great Blacks Commendation Act of 2003.

== Family background and early life ==
George Bonga's father Pierre was the son of Jean and Marie-Jeannette Bonga, enslaved people who had been brought to the fort on Mackinac Island by their enslaver, Captain Daniel Robertson, a British officer who commanded it from 1782 to 1787. Robertson freed the Bonga family before his departure for Montreal, and the Bongas legally married. Bonga and his wife opened the first hotel on the island.

Pierre Bonga worked as a fur trader with the Ojibwe near Duluth. His first son Stephen Bonga, born 1799, also became a notable fur trader and translator in the region. His daughter, Marguerite Bonga (born c. 1797) married the first Swedish settler in Minnesota, Jacob Fahlstrom and the couple lived and worked near Fort Snelling for a time before establishing a farm in Afton in modern-day Minnesota.

As Pierre Bonga was a relatively successful trader, he sent George to Montreal for school. When the youth returned to the Great Lakes region, he spoke fluent English, French, as well as Ojibwe.

George was noted in what is now Minnesota for being, as his brother Stephen claimed, "One of the first two black children born in the state." Stephen also described them as "the first white children" born there, as the Ojibwe classified everyone who was non-native as "white".

== Career in the fur trade ==
George Bonga followed in his father's footsteps and entered the fur trade. He first joined the American Fur Company as a voyageur. In this role, Bonga drew the attention of Territorial Governor Lewis Cass, who hired him as an interpreter for a treaty council with the Ojibwe in Fond du Lac in 1820. Years later, George Bonga's signature appeared on treaties in 1847 and 1867.

George Bonga was described as standing over six feet (1.8 m) tall and weighing over 200 pounds (91 kg). Reports claims said that he would carry 700 pounds (320 kg) of furs and supplies at once.

Bonga had gained an education among both European and Ojibwe societies, and frequently crossed their borders. Comfortable in white and Ojibwe society, Bonga identified with both. Reportedly, Bonga called himself one of the first two "white men" in Northern Minnesota. He was speaking of his participation in 'white' culture. He criticized white men who treated Ojibwe trappers unfairly. Bonga wrote letters on behalf of the Ojibwe, complaining to the state government about individual Indian agents in the region. His letters, which point out both his connections to the white government and the Ojibwe, illustrate the ways that Bonga traversed cultural boundaries.

In 1837 an Ojibwe man, Che-ga-wa-skung, was accused of murdering Alfred Aitkin at Red Cedar Lake (now Cass Lake). Aitkin was the son of the fur trader William Alexander Aitken. Che-ga-wa-skung escaped from custody. Bonga trailed the man over five days and six nights during the winter, eventually catching him. He brought the suspect back to Fort Snelling for trial. In one of the first United States criminal proceedings in what was then part of Wisconsin Territory, Che-ga-wa-skung was tried and acquitted. Che-ga-wa-skung was acquitted because Alfred Aitkin was half-Ojibwe and therefore the court decided it had no jurisdiction over the case.

Bonga was unpopular with some Ojibwe because of his role in the case, but he continued living with or near the people for the rest of his life. In 1842, he married Ashwinn, an Ojibwe woman. They had four children together.

1842 marked the effective end of the American Fur Company. With the beaver nearly extinct and European fashions changing, the fur trade that had been Bonga's livelihood had declined dramatically. In its place, Bonga and his wife turned to lodge keeping, and for many years, they welcomed travelers into their lodge on Leech Lake. Some travelers reported on Bonga telling stories of early Minnesota and singing for their enjoyment. Bonga died there when he was around seventy years old.

== Legacy and honors ==
- Bungo Township in Cass County is named after his family. Spelling varied widely at this time.
- Playwright Carlyle Brown created a play based on Bonga's life titled George Bonga: Black Voyageur which opened in February 2016 at History Theatre in Saint Paul, Minnesota, with James A. Williams starring as Bonga.

== See also ==
- Territorial era of Minnesota
- James Beckwourth
