= Margaret Bonga Fahlstrom =

19th-century Ojibwe-African American woman in Minnesota

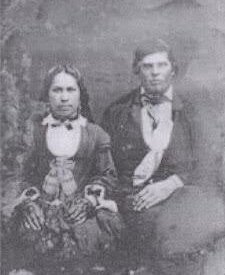
- Margaret with Jacob Fahlstrom
- Born: c. 1797; Fond du Lac (Duluth), Lake Superior
- Died: February 6, 1880; Afton, Washington County, Minnesota
- Other names: Marguerite Bonga; Margaret Bungo; Margaret Falstrom; Margaret Folstrom
- Spouse: Jacob Fahlstrom (m.1823)
- Relatives: Pierre Bonga (father); George Bonga (brother); Stephen Bonga (brother)

Margaret Bonga Fahlstrom (c. 1797 – February 6, 1880) was a mixed-race woman of African and Ojibwe descent who came from a fur trading family in the Great Lakes region. In 1823, she married Jacob Fahlstrom, the first Swedish settler in Minnesota, and lived with him on a small farm at Coldwater Spring near Fort Snelling. Margaret was one of the few free Black women living in the area around the time that enslaved women such as Harriet Robinson Scott were struggling to find a path to freedom. In 1838, the Fahlstroms became the first converts to the Methodist faith in Minnesota, and moved to a farm in Washington County in 1840. Jacob became well known as the Methodist lay preacher "Father Jacob". His success as a traveling Christian missionary was often attributed to his fluency in the Ojibwe language, as well as his marriage. Margaret and her daughters were also known for their involvement in early church meetings in Minnesota, and their hospitality toward Methodist circuit riders.

In his 1888 book Fifty Years in the Northwest, historian W.H.C. Folsom described Margaret as "a woman of fine mind...very few of any age or race can be found her equal." During 35 years of marriage, the Fahlstroms had nine children. They eventually settled in Afton, Minnesota, where Margaret is buried next to her husband.

== Family heritage and early life ==
According to census records, Marguerite Bonga was born around 1797 in the area near Lake Superior. Her parents were Pierre Bonga, a Black fur trader, and his Ojibwe wife, Ojibwayquay. Her father Pierre had been baptized as Catholic in Montreal. Raised in a multicultural environment, the Bonga children spoke French, Ojibwe and English.

=== Bonga family background ===
Her paternal grandparents, Jean and Marie-Jeanne Bonga, were well known tavern keepers on Mackinac Island in present-day Michigan. They spoke French and had arrived in Michilimackinac as enslaved African West Indians in the early 1780s together with their young children. From 1782 to 1787, they were slaves of Captain Daniel Robertson, a British Army officer who served as commandant of Fort Mackinac. In 1787, Robertson freed Jean, Marie-Jeanne and their four children before returning to Montreal.

The circumstances surrounding the Bonga family's arrival in Mackinac are somewhat unclear. In 1781, the Bongas had been captured as prisoners during the American Revolutionary War in the Illinois Country. Some have suggested that they were then taken to Mackinac Island by Indian traders, who sold them on to Captain Robertson as slaves. Others have speculated that Robertson brought them to the fort himself.

=== Entry into fur trade ===
Pierre Bonga, Marguerite's father, built a successful career in the fur trade. He started as a personal servant and middleman, but eventually worked hjs way up to voyageur and interpreter for the North West Company, and later the South West Company, a subsidiary of the American Fur Company.

As a young man, Pierre worked for fur trader John Sayer in the Fond du Lac area south and west of Lake Superior, as early as 1795. From 1802–1806, he worked with Alexander Henry the Younger in the Red River and Pembina River regions.

=== Ojibwe mother ===
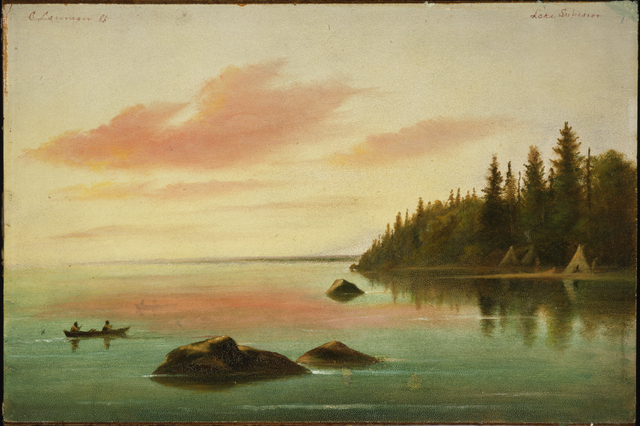
Native American settlement at Lake Superior

Pierre most likely met his wife while working with John Sayer at Fond du Lac. Her name, recorded as Ojibwayquay or Ogibwayquay, translates simply as "Ojibwe woman." They were first married à la façon du pays rather than in a church, which was common practice among fur traders and their Native American wives. She was from one of the Lake Superior Chippewa bands, such as the Fond du Lac band of Ojibwe, or the Leech Lake band historically known as the Pillagers. One source says that she had many relatives in the historical Mille Lacs band of Ojibwe.

Marguerite was born at Fond du Lac (Duluth) in 1797. One source suggests her Ojibwe name was Kahjiji. In 1802, Ojibwayquay accompanied Pierre to the North West company post near Pembina, where she gave birth to Marguerite's sister. It is unclear whether their other children traveled with them or were left with relatives in Fond du Lac during the expedition.

=== Siblings ===
Marguerite's most famous siblings were George Bonga and Stephen Bonga, who both had careers in the fur trade. Her brother Stephen and their eldest brother Jean-Baptiste had been sent to work as servants for North West Company partners from a young age. She most likely had two sisters who were born between George and Stephen. Multiple sources also mention their youngest sibling Jack, born around 1815, who came of age in the fur trade as it was starting to decline.

As they were growing up, the family maintained ties with their Bonga relatives, who had moved to Montreal following the death of Jean Bonga in 1795. Stephen (Étienne), George and her sister Blanche were baptized in the Catholic Church in Montreal in 1810 and 1811. George attended school in Montreal.

In July 1820, Henry Schoolcraft visited Fond du Lac as part of an expedition headed by Territorial Governor Lewis Cass of Michigan. They encountered Pierre Bonga and his family, whom Schoolcraft described as follows:

Three miles above the mouth of the St. Louis River, there is a village of Chippeway Indians, of fourteen lodges, and containing a population of about sixty souls. Among these we noticed a negro who has long been in the service of the fur company, and who married a squaw, by whom he has four children. It is worthy of remark, that the children are as black as the father, and have the curled hair and glossy skin of the native African.

== Marriage to Jacob Fahlstrom ==
Margaret Bonga married Jacob Fahlstrom in 1823 at Fond du Lac. He is often referred to as "the first Swede in Minnesota." After working in the fur trade for over a decade, he spoke English, French, Ojibwe, Iroquois and Dakota, in addition to his native Swedish. Jacob was called Ozaawindib or "Yellow Head" by the Ojibwe because of his blond hair.

No further information is available about their wedding in 1823. Methodist missionary Alfred Brunson, who later became acquainted with the Falstroms in 1838, wrote in his memoirs that Jacob, "as all traders, deemed it necessary to form a connection with the Indians to sell their trade and protection by taking a 'wife of the daughters of the land.'" Brunson further noted that Jacob's intentions in marrying Margaret seemed to have been "in good faith – not as some traders, only for the time being."

=== Fahlstrom's background ===
Born in Stockholm around 1794, Jacob was said to have left Sweden on a ship with his uncle, and possibly shipwrecked off the British Isles. In 1811, he signed a five-year contract with the Hudson's Bay Company and traveled from Stornoway, Scotland to Canada as a cabin boy. After completing his apprenticeship at York Factory in Manitoba in 1816, he briefly joined their rivals at North West Company, before leaving them in Sault Ste. Marie to work for the American Fur Company. He reportedly worked with the American Fur Company for seven years, and was employed by the company's Fond du Lac Outfit in Duluth as a boatman from 1819 to 1822. Around this time, Jacob started traveling with his brigade through Minnesota country to trade with native people around Leech Lake and Red Lake. He was seen at the mouth of the Minnesota River when the U.S. Army arrived in 1819 to build Fort Snelling.

=== Children ===
Records suggest that their first child John was born around 1823 at Sandy Lake and that their second child Nancy was born soon after at Lake Superior. Another child, Sarah (Sally), was born at Gull Lake. They also had a daughter named Jane.

Over time they would have nine children two of whom died as young children. Census records indicate that Cecilia, James and George were born at Lake Superior in 1835, 1837 and 1844, respectively. At least one historian has questioned whether this was actually the case, given the long and difficult journey Margaret would have had to make from the Fort Snelling area, where they were based in 1835 and 1837, or from Lakeland, where the Fahlstroms lived in 1844.

== Life at Coldwater Spring ==
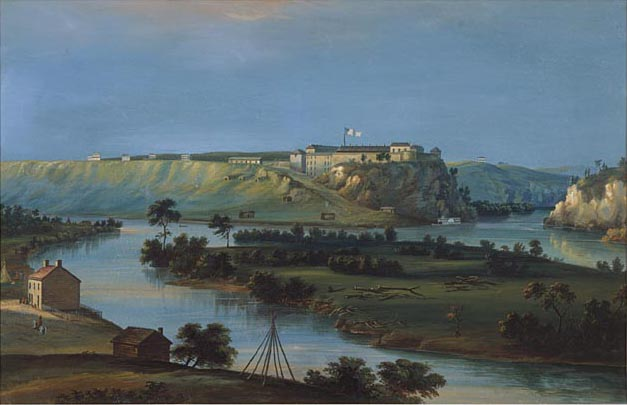
Fort Snelling as it appeared in 1844

In the 1830s, the growing Fahlstrom family lived on a small farm near Coldwater Spring, less than two miles from Fort Snelling, where a cluster of cabins had been built in the 1820s.

Jacob had started working for the U.S. government around 1825, after the fort was built. Two years later, he was sent to Prairie du Chien for one year, then returned to Fort Snelling for two more years. He was then sent to Galena for a year, after which he returned once again to Fort Snelling. He worked as a "striker" for the blacksmiths at St. Peter's Indian Agency, supplied wood, and served as a mail carrier. A map of Camp Coldwater drawn in 1837 marks "Jacob's" residence next to one of the blacksmiths' shops.

=== Native families at Camp Coldwater ===
Living at Camp Coldwater, Margaret was one of several Native women of either Dakota or Ojibwe ancestry; most of the other Native women were also part-European. Some, like Margaret, were married to blacksmiths and laborers working for the Indian agency. Others were wives of current and former employees of fur traders such as Benjamin F. Baker, who ran the trading post at Coldwater Spring, or Henry Hastings Sibley, regional manager for American Fur Company based across the river in Mendota. Some women who lived on the site were refugees from the Red River Colony, also known as the Selkirk settlement, in Canada.

VanderVelde suggests that although Margaret Bonga Fahlstrom and Madeliene Campbell, the part-Dakota daughter of agency interpreter Scott Campbell, were free, they would have had a much "poorer" standard of living compared to Harriet Robinson living as a servant in the Taliaferro household. She writes, "The Campbells and the Fahlstroms survived without a stove, candles, an ice house, or more important, regular supplies of goods from the St. Louis markets." In July 1834, Agent Taliaferro himself wrote that he felt sorry for Jacob Fahlstrom as a poor man with a large family to support, after one of his oxen had been killed by a Dakota man.

=== Agency relations with the Ojibwe ===
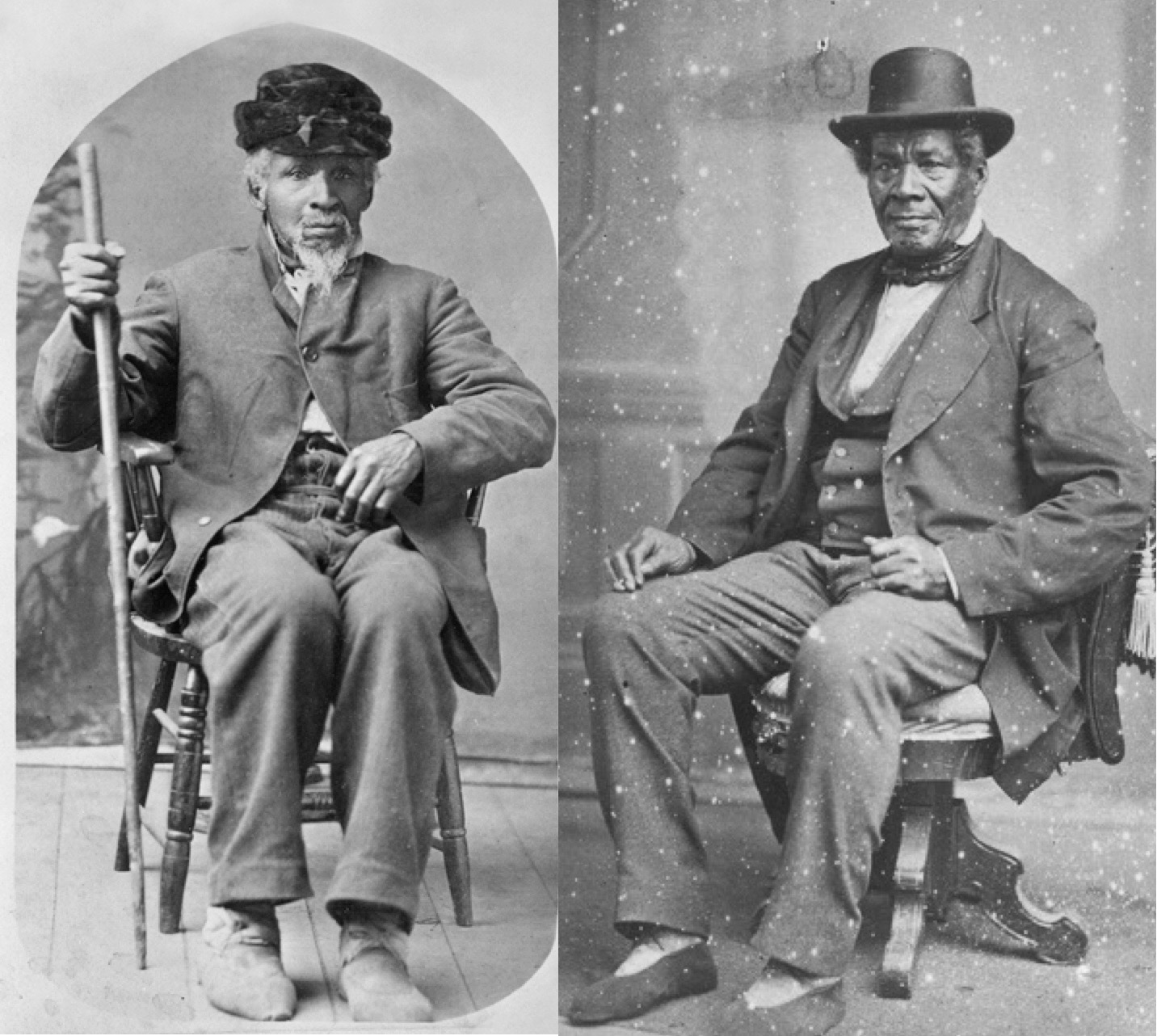
Her brothers Stephen Bonga (left) and George Bonga (right), c. 1870–1880

Margaret's brothers often visited her at Camp Coldwater, although they mainly continued to trade with the Ojibwe tribes further north. Her brother Stephen was often hired by Agent Taliaferro as an Ojibwe interpreter, and is thought to have lived with the Fahlstroms for some time. In June 1837, interpreter Stephen Bonga was a signatory to the Treaty of St. Peters, also known as the "White Pine Treaty," which had been negotiated between Governor Henry Dodge of Wisconsin Territory and several bands of Ojibwe (Chippewa), and significantly influenced by American Fur Company traders. One of the stipulations was that "mixed-blood" relatives of the Ojibwe, including those who had signed on behalf of the United States, would collectively receive $100,000.

==== Intertribal tensions ====
On August 2, 1838, Benjamin Baker's stone trading house at Coldwater Spring was the site of a deadly skirmish between the Dakota and the Ojibwe. A party of Dakota attempted to kill Ojibwe Chief Hole-in-the-Day (the elder) in retaliation for an Ojibwe attack at Lac qui Parle a few months prior, in which seven Dakota had been killed while they were sleeping. The casualties at Coldwater included one Odawa man who was killed, one Dakota man who was killed, and one Ojibwe man who was wounded. Hole-in-the-Day and his men were given temporary protection within the walls of Fort Snelling, angering the Dakota.

In June 1839, Agent Taliaferro sent Stephen Bonga to convey a message to Ojibwe Chief Hole-in-the-Day, asking him to stop 500 members of his tribe from coming en masse to the St. Peter's Agency. Taliaferro had learned that they were on their way to complain about having to travel to La Pointe on Lake Superior to collect their annuity payments. His primary aim was to prevent further conflict between the Ojibwe and the Dakota Sioux. Chief Hole-in-the-Day refused to turn back.

Upon his arrival on June 20, Hole-in-the-Day asked for permission to stay for three days, and held a council with Dakota leaders under a canopy outside the walls of Fort Snelling, with Stephen Bonga as the interpreter. By Sunday, June 23, 1839, tensions simmered as a reported 846 Ojibwe men, women and children converged in encampments around St. Peter's Agency and across the prairie. Meanwhile, 1,200 Dakota also waited nearby for food and provisions they expected the U.S. government to provide, as promised in the land cession treaties of 1837. The Ojibwe and Dakota reportedly spent the day "dancing together, and in foot races." On June 24, a man named Libbey arrived by steamboat and sold 36 gallons of whiskey to Dakota interpreter Scott Campbell, resulting in "pandemonium." On June 30, Chief Hole-in-the-Day announced that he would be leaving, and on July 1, the Ojibwe and the Dakota smoked the pipe of peace.

=== Eviction from the military reservation ===
The land cession treaties of 1837 triggered a new influx of "squatters" into the region. Officers at Fort Snelling complained of problems with drunkenness, resulting from the illicit sale of whiskey to soldiers, and the rapid depletion of timber and pasture nearby. Before the Treaty with the Sioux was concluded in September, a group of long-time residents of Camp Coldwater including Jacob Fahlstrom signed a formal petition sent to President Martin Van Buren on August 16, 1837, expressing concern about pending changes to their land use rights. The memorial stated that many of them had "erected houses and cultivated fields at their present places of residence, and several of them have large families of children who have no other homes."

In 1839, the United States Secretary of War Joel Roberts Poinsett ordered all settlers on the Fort Snelling military reservation to be removed. In the spring of 1840, all civilians on the military reservation including Camp Coldwater were asked to leave, or forcibly evicted, by a deputy marshal sent from Prairie du Chien. The Fahlstroms moved across the river, only to learn they were still on reservation land, and were evicted two more times. They eventually settled in the St. Croix River valley – first in Lakeland, and then in Afton.

== Life as a preacher's wife ==
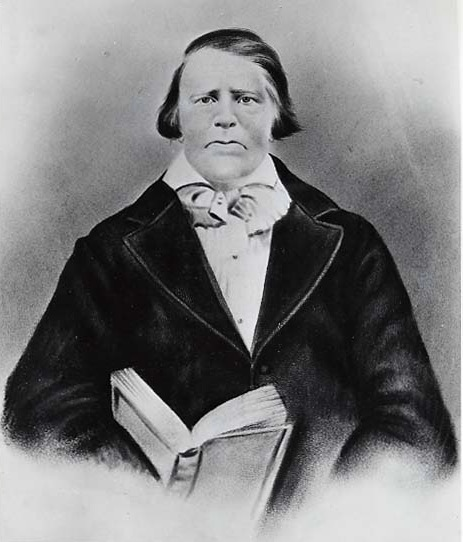
Father Jacob with his Swedish pocket bible

Over the next 20 years, Jacob Fahlstrom went on to become famous as a Methodist missionary. Called "Father Jacob," he was the first Methodist convert in Minnesota, known among Methodists as the most "effective" minister preaching to Native Americans in the region. Jacob's fluency in the Ojibwe language and the family ties he had to the Ojibwe through his marriage to Margaret are often mentioned as key factors in his success. Church publications document Margaret's participation at Methodist gatherings and mention her support of Methodist circuit riders by welcoming them into their home. Local historians also note her devotion to Christianity. In his book Fifty Years in the Northwest (1888), historian W.H.C. Folsom alludes to Margaret's formidable intellect:

At Lake Superior, in 1823, [Jacob] had been married to Margaret Burgo, a woman of fine mind. With her limited educational privileges, very few of any age or race can be found her equal. Mr. and Mrs. Folstrom were both consistent Christians, and members of the Methodist church for many years.

=== Conversion to Methodism ===
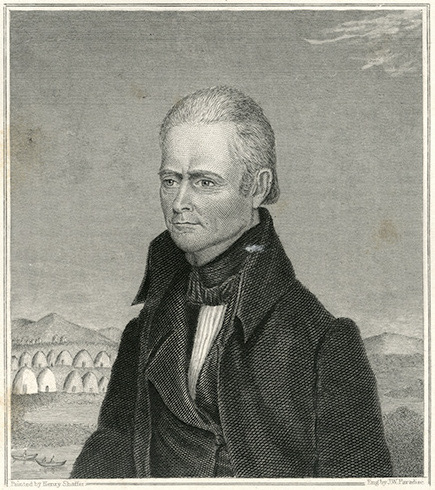
Methodist missionary Reverend Alfred Brunson (1837)

In 1837, Margaret's brother Stephen Bonga was hired by the Reverend Alfred Brunson as his interpreter among the Ojibwe. "Elder Brunson," as he was called, established the Methodist mission among the Mdewakanton Dakota at Kaposia village that year.

In the spring of 1838, Brunson met Jacob Fahlstrom in the spring of 1838 at his small farm near Coldwater Spring, and soon converted him to Methodism. Although his Methodist mission would be widely regarded as a failure, without a single convert among the Dakota, Elder Brunson himself considered the conversion of the Fahlstrom family as his most significant achievement during these years. He wrote in his memoirs, A Western Pioneer (1880):

This state of things among the Indians was very detrimental to our operations among them, yet we were not without some fruit. Jacob Fallstrum was converted, which led to the conversion of his family and their education, and they are yet doing good in Minnesota... The conversion of this family and their subsequent respectability and usefulness, as the fruit of our missionary operations in that country, was worth all its cost.

Several Fahlstrom family members including Margaret are listed in a "class record" of the Methodist Episcopal Church at Kaposia (Red Rock) as "Jacob Folstrom, Mrs. Folstrom, Nancy Folstrom, Jane Folstrom, Sally Folstrom," with David King as preacher and John Holton as leader. Their eldest daughter Nancy Fahlstrom was later remembered as "a woman of rare intellect and accomplishments" who served as an interpreter during services and meetings which the missionaries conducted with the Dakota at Red Rock prairie, where a new church and school had opened after the Kaposia mission had closed.

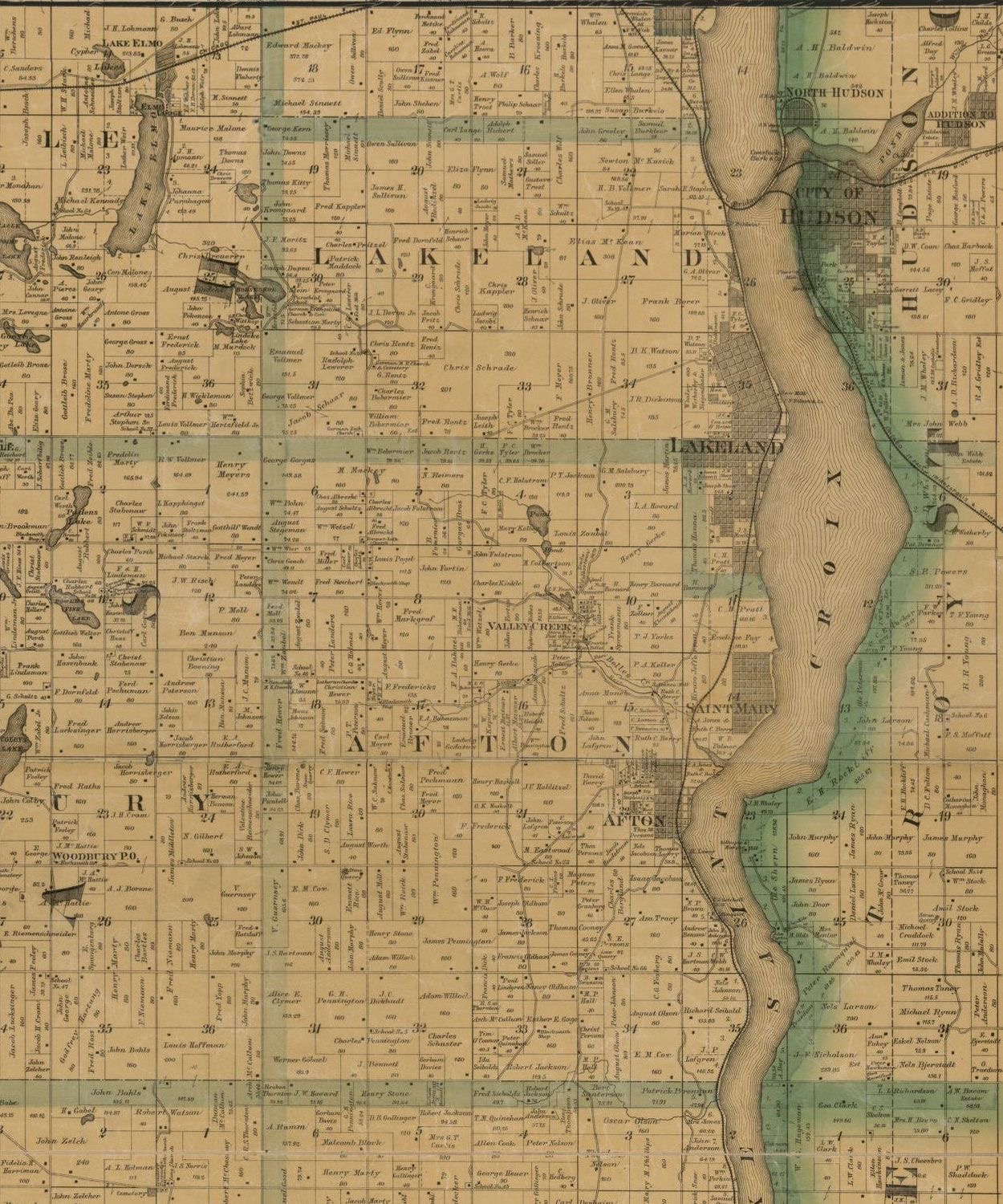
Property map of Lakeland and Afton, Minnesota (1887)

=== Move to Washington County ===
Following their eviction from Camp Coldwater, the Fahlstroms moved to Washington County in the St. Croix River valley. From 1840 to 1850, they lived in the area that would become platted as Lakeland. In 1850, they settled on a farm at Valley Creek in Afton.

In 1840, Jacob was granted a license as an "exhorter" in the Methodist Church and began missionary work as the first lay preacher serving Big Sandy Lake and Fond du Lac. He was often away from home, traveling extensively throughout his parish, which extended from the Rum River at Anoka to Lake Superior. He also earned an income as a mail carrier between Prairie du Chien and St. Croix Falls. Stories about his travels and encounters with wild animals and Indians added to Fahlstrom's lasting reputation as a brave adventurer.

While living in Washington County, Margaret and the Fahlstrom children "kept open-house for weary – and hungry – circuit riders," the traveling clergymen of the Methodist Church.

Each spring, Margaret and her children were said to enjoy visiting maple-covered Manitou Island in the middle of White Bear Lake to make maple sugar. The production of maple sugar had historically been controlled by Ojibwe women, and had been a long-standing tradition at White Bear Lake, possibly going back a century or more.

== Later years in Afton ==
Jacob Fahlstrom died in 1859. Margaret and her eldest daughter Nancy continued living on the Fahlstrom homestead, which was taken over by her youngest son, George.

=== "Half-breed" scrip ===
On May 11, 1864, Margaret Folstrom and her daughter Nancy were issued with "half-breed scrip" for 80 acres each from the United States Department of the Interior, as "mixed-bloods belonging to the Chippewa of Lake Superior, as provided for by treaty of 1854." In 1863, the Commissioner of Indian Affairs had ruled that "mixed-blood" applicants would be eligible for the land grants regardless of whether or not they had actually resided with the Chippewa of Lake Superior at the time the treaty had been signed.

=== Death ===
Margaret Bonga Fahlstrom died on February 6, 1880. She was buried next to Jacob in the Fahlstrom Cemetery in Afton Township. In 1964, the Minnesota Methodist Historical Society placed a memorial on their resting place, with her name engraved as "Margaret Bungo Fahlstrom."

== Historiography ==
In recent years, researchers have questioned why Margaret Bonga Fahlstrom has been largely ignored by historians, while there has been so much interest in the life of Jacob Fahlstrom. Mattie Harper DeCarlo writes, "Without Margaret, it is unlikely that he would have secured the work or achieved the social positions that have drawn the attention of historians, scholars, and the general public." DeCarlo argues that Margaret Bonga's story was marginalized due to "settler colonial narratives," which also served to "erase her as a woman of African ancestry."

=== Racial and ethnic identity in fur trade society ===
In North Country: Making of Minnesota (2010), historian Mary Lethert Wingerd writes that "race" in pre-territorial Minnesota usually referred to the difference between "white" and "Indian." Because of widespread intermarriage spanning over a century, racial identities in Minnesota country were defined based on cultural and lifestyle choices rather than skin color or blood quantum. She suggests that this was a "uniquely liberating" setting for people of African descent such as George Bonga, while acknowledging the irony of slavery tolerated by the United States government in Minnesota.

In her 2012 Ph.D. thesis, Mattie Harper concludes that within the fur trade, George Bonga and his brothers were viewed as "half breeds" who were no different from their colleagues of mixed ancestry – usually with an Indian mother and a white or "mixed-blood" father of European descent. She suggests that Jacob Fahlstrom's decision to marry Margaret Bonga was indicative of the influential position of her father Pierre Bonga and his Ojibwe kinship networks; the fact that she had skills useful to a fur trade family; and that she was probably viewed as culturally "French" within North American fur trade society.

At least one Minnesota historian who was a contemporary of the Fahlstroms, Reverend Edward D. Neill, identified Margaret simply as "a Chippewa." In 1888, however, Neill mentioned Margaret's grandfather, Jean Bonga, as one of the "negroes taken prisoner in the Illinois country," in an article about the history of British rule in the region including Minnesota. He noted that Bonga had many descendants in Minnesota, but did not mention any by name.

In Minnesota in Three Centuries (1908), historian Return Ira Holcombe referred to Margaret simply as "a half-blood Chippewa woman" who married Jacob Fahlstrom. However, in discussing her brother, he referred to "George Bonga, the mixed blood Indian and negro, sub-trader under Aitken."

=== Women in the Methodist movement ===
In Forever Beginning (1973), T. Otto Nall mentions Margaret Fahlstrom as part of a long tradition of women playing an important role in supporting the missionary work of the Methodist Church. Nall explains that the founder of the Methodist movement, John Wesley, had appointed women to take an active role in leading classes, speaking about their Christian experiences, reading sermons, and giving short exhortations. In 1771, Wesley acknowledged that women could have "an extraordinary call" as lay preachers.

=== Swedish-American and Canadian historical accounts ===
In 1879, early Swedish-American historian Robert Grönberger wrote that Fahlstrom had married a woman who was part Indian and part Negro. In 1890, another historian, Eric Norelius, wrote that Fahlstrom's wife was part Chippewa and part Negro and that they spoke Chippewa at home, according to a missionary farmer at the Methodist mission in Red Rock.

In A History of the Swedish-Americans of Minnesota (1910), Algot E. Strand wrote about Jacob Fahlstrom: "It was said among the old Swedish settlers that his wife was a mixture of Indian and Negro blood but this is emphatically denied by her children who show no trace of Negro blood." Strand claimed that Margaret was the daughter of "Bungo," whom he described erroneously as head chief of the Lake Superior Chippewa.

In 1984, Emeroy Johnson questioned the accuracy of Grönberger's original account, commenting, "It is highly unlikely that a Negro woman was in northern Wisconsin and married to an Indian in the latter part of the 18th century."

In Swedes in Canada: Invisible Immigrants (2015), historian Elinor Barr writes that Jacob Fahlstrom married "Margaret Bonga, daughter of an Ojibwa woman and Pierre Bonga, a Black man who worked for the North West Company ca. 1804–14 and then for the American Fur Company."

=== Recent interest in Bonga family history ===
In recent years there has been a resurgence in interest in the history of the Bonga family, including Margaret Bonga Fahlstrom.
