= Ozaawindib (disambiguation) =

Ozaawindib may refer to:

- Ozaawindib (fl. 1797–1832), Ojibwa warrior
- Ozaawindib (Chippewa chief), 19th century Ojibwa chief for the Prairie Rice Lake Band of Lake Superior Chippewa Indians
- Ozaawindib (Mille Lacs chief), chief of the Mille Lacs Indians
- Jacob Fahlström, the first Swede to settle in Minnesota, called Ozaawindib by the Ojibwe for his blond hair
