= Pierre Bonga =

French African fur trader in North America

Pierre Chimakadewiiash Bonga (Ojibwe: Makadewiiyas, "Black-skinned"; recorded as "Mukdaweos") (c. 1770 – 1831, Minnesota) was a black trapper and interpreter for the North West Company, based in Canada near Mackinac Island. He later worked for John Jacob Astor's American Fur Company, primarily along the Red River of the North and near Lake Superior in present-day Wisconsin and Minnesota.

Like many fur trappers, he married an Ojibwe woman, as he was operating in the territory of her people. The mixed-race children of Pierre and his wife Ogibwayquay were raised in the Ojibwe culture. Two of their sons followed their father into the fur trade, and established reputations as interpreters and guides.

== Early life and family background ==
Born in the 1770s, Pierre was among the children of Jean and Marie-Jeanne Bonga, an enslaved couple. In 1781, they were captured as prisoners in the Illinois Country during the American Revolutionary War, and sold to Indian traders at Mackinac Island. Jean and Marie-Jeanne Bonga were retained by Captain Daniel Robertson (c.1733–1810) when he took over command of Fort Michilimackinac (now known as Fort Mackinac), serving there from 1782 to 1787. In 1787, Robertson returned to Montreal, freeing the Bongas before he left.

Mackinac Island had long been a center of fur trade with the Ojibwe and Ottawa people, by French, British and American traders. The population were mostly descendants of French colonists and Métis people, and French was still the dominant language. Freed by Robertson before his departure, the Bonga couple married on 25 June 1794, with Jean Nicolas Marchesseaux as a witness, in the Catholic church on Mackinac Island. They stayed on the island and opened its first hotel. Jean Bonga died on Mackinac Island in 1795.

Growing up on Mackinac Island, Pierre Bonga learned English and Ojibwe, as well as becoming highly skilled at trapping and scouting. He was called Makadewiiyas (black-skinned) in Ojibwe (his name was recorded as Mukadaweos).

== Entry into fur trade ==
He entered the fur trade in the region, first working for the North West Company, based in British Canada. Later he worked for the American Fur Company of John Jacob Astor, as well as others in the area.

In 1802 Pierre was reported to be working with the North West Company under Alexander Henry the younger at the Red River of the North.

Bonga died in 1831, in what is now Minnesota. His estate passed to his children, after his sisters accepted £11 to waive their interest.

== Marriage and children ==
Sources differ in accounts of Bonga's marriage and family. Historian W. Sherman Savage documented the Bonga children as Marguerite (b. 1797-98 in the Lake Superior area-d. 1880) (m. Jacob Fahlstrom in 1823 at Fond du Lac); Stephen (b. June 1799 near Superior, Wisconsin -d. 1889) (m. Susan); and George (b. abt. 1802 near Duluth, Minnesota-d. 1884) (m. to two Ojibwe women).

The ethnologist Henry R. Schoolcraft recorded meeting the unusual family in 1820 in his Narrative Journal of Travels; he remarked that the children looked more African than Indian. Stephen Bonga later liked to describe himself as the "first white child" born in Wisconsin, as the Ojibwe classified all non-Native Americans as "white".

== Legacy ==
- Both Stephen and George Bonga established reputations as interpreters and guides in the fur trade. Stephen Bonga acted as a guide to Eastman Johnson when the American artist traveled to the Wisconsin frontier on a trip to his sister. Bonga provided introductions to the Ojibwe people, which enabled Johnson to paint intimate studies of the people.

== In popular culture ==
Sinclair Lewis, in his novel Kingsblood Royal (1947), presents his protagonist Neil Kingsblood as descended from Xavier Pic, a freed slave from the French colony of Martinique who had a life on the American frontier. As described by Lewis, Pic's life in the novel loosely parallels that of the historic Pierre Bonga. In addition, Lewis directly refers to the Bonga family in the novel.
