= Jacob Fahlström =

First Swedish settler in Minnesota

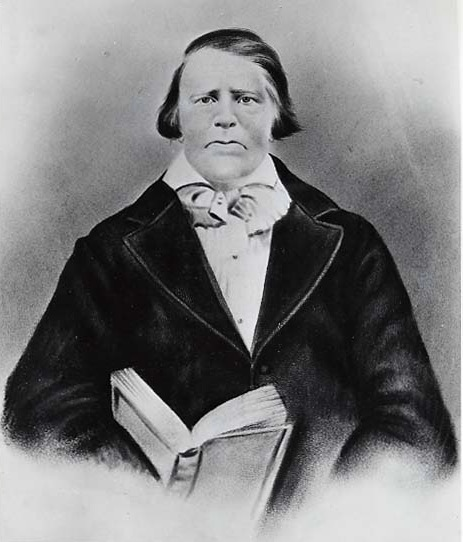
Jacob Fahlström, c. 1850.

Jacob Fahlström (c.1794–1859), also known as Father Jacob, was the very first Swede to settle in Minnesota. He was known as Ozaawindib or "Yellow Head" to the Ojibwe, and to other white settlers as the "Swede Indian." After working in the fur trade for the Hudson's Bay Company in Manitoba, he joined the American Fur Company at Fond du Lac (in present-day Duluth) as a boatman. In 1823, he married Margaret Bonga, the part-Ojibwe daughter of Pierre Bonga, a French African interpreter in the fur trade. Around 1825, he started working for the U.S. government as a woodsman, mail carrier, and blacksmith's striker at the St. Peter's Indian Agency next to Fort Snelling.

In 1838, Fahlström became the first Methodist convert in Minnesota. In 1840, he became a lay preacher for the Methodist Episcopal Church and was considered one of their most successful missionaries to Native Americans in the region. Fluent in Ojibwe and English, he also spoke French, Dakota and Iroquois, in addition to his native Swedish. His parish extended from the Rum River to Lake Superior. Stories of his adventures in the wilderness and his encounters with Indians made him a legendary figure in Minnesota history. During the last decade of his life, he also preached to newly immigrated Swedes who became part of a growing community near his family farm in Afton, Minnesota where he was buried in 1859.

In June 1948, Prince Bertil of Sweden unveiled a plaque in his honor on Kellogg Boulevard in Saint Paul.

== Biography ==
Jacob Fahlstrom was born in Stockholm around 1794 into a well-to-do family. As a boy, he was known for his beautiful singing voice. He also had a wandering foot which took him down to the docks where he set sail as cabin boy on a vessel captained by his uncle.

Young Jacob survived a shipwreck on the English coast. He then made his way to London where he joined up with Lord Selkirk's expedition to Hudson Bay in 1807. One day, while out hunting in the New World, he got lost and wandered for eight days until he was taken in by an Ojibwe woman. He learned the Ojibwe language and wore Indian attire. He became known to the Ojibwe as Ozaawindib or "Yellow Head" because of his blond hair, and became known to the white settlers as the "Swede Indian" for his Indian dress.

He became a fur trader, first for the Hudson's Bay Company and later for the American Fur Company. As he traveled from one Indian village to another in quest of pelts, he picked up many languages and learned about their cultures. In addition to speaking Swedish, English, French and Ojibwe, Fahlstrom learned Dakota and Iroquois.

Jacob Fahlstrom drifted southward to Minnesota country around 1818. He traded for beaver pelts with the Ojibwe at Leech Lake and Red Lake. As Fort Snelling was being built in 1820, he took two jobs: supplying the fort with wood and carrying the mail north to the Lake Superior region, and from Prairie du Chien to St. Croix Falls.

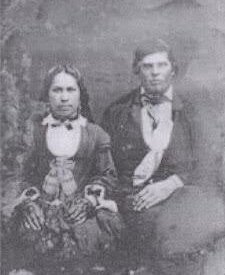
Marguerite Bonga Fahlström & Jacob Fahlström

In 1823 he married Marguerite Bonga Fahlström, daughter of Pierre Bonga of the Lake Superior Chippewa. One of her grandfathers was a freed slave from Africa. In 1837 or 1838 the "Swede Indian" was converted at the Methodist mission at the Mdewakanton Dakota village of Kaposia. Thereafter he became a sort of missionary to the Indians and also to the men of the lumber camps in the north woods.

In 1841 Fahlstrom moved to what would become Washington County, where he took up a claim at Valley Creek near Afton. His home there was pretty well filled with nine children, but he still longed to travel. It is said that he once owned 80 acres (320,000 m^{2}) where the business district of St. Paul stands today. Unfortunately he gave up this claim because he thought the place was too hilly. He had more use for the island he owned in White Bear Lake; it was covered with sugar maples, and his wife and children made sugar there every spring.

Jacob Fahlstrom died in 1859. His widow Marguerite survived until 1880.

== Legacy ==
The graves of Jacob and Marguerite Fahlstrom are marked in a small graveyard on Fahlstrom Place road in Afton, Minnesota. Jacob Fahlstrom has also been honored by having his portrait hung in the Swedish Art Institute of Minneapolis. It is not a work of art, however, but rather dark and forbidding with a half-circle fringe of whiskers, revealing nothing of the character of the man which was kindly, sincere and devoted. In Augustus Easton's History of the St. Croix Valley (1909), he is described as follows:

Jacob Fahlstrom was a sort of preacher, and he could pray pretty well, and could be depended on upon to do so, providing a good meal was in sight. Many a good meal he got at Carli's (Tamarack House at Stillwater) in return for his old-fashioned prayers.

The missionaries at Kaposia and Red Rock considered "Father Jacob" as he had now came to be called, such a valuable brand snatched from the burning that his conversion seemed like compensation for their unproductive labors among the Sioux. Elder Brunson is said to have stated that this event alone justified the existence of the Kaposia mission. Here was one who understood the red men far better than they, one who could be depended upon to carry the Gospel on all his adventurous journeys among the Indians and likewise the white settlements in what is now Washington County.
