= Daniel Robertson (British Army officer) =

British military officer in Canada

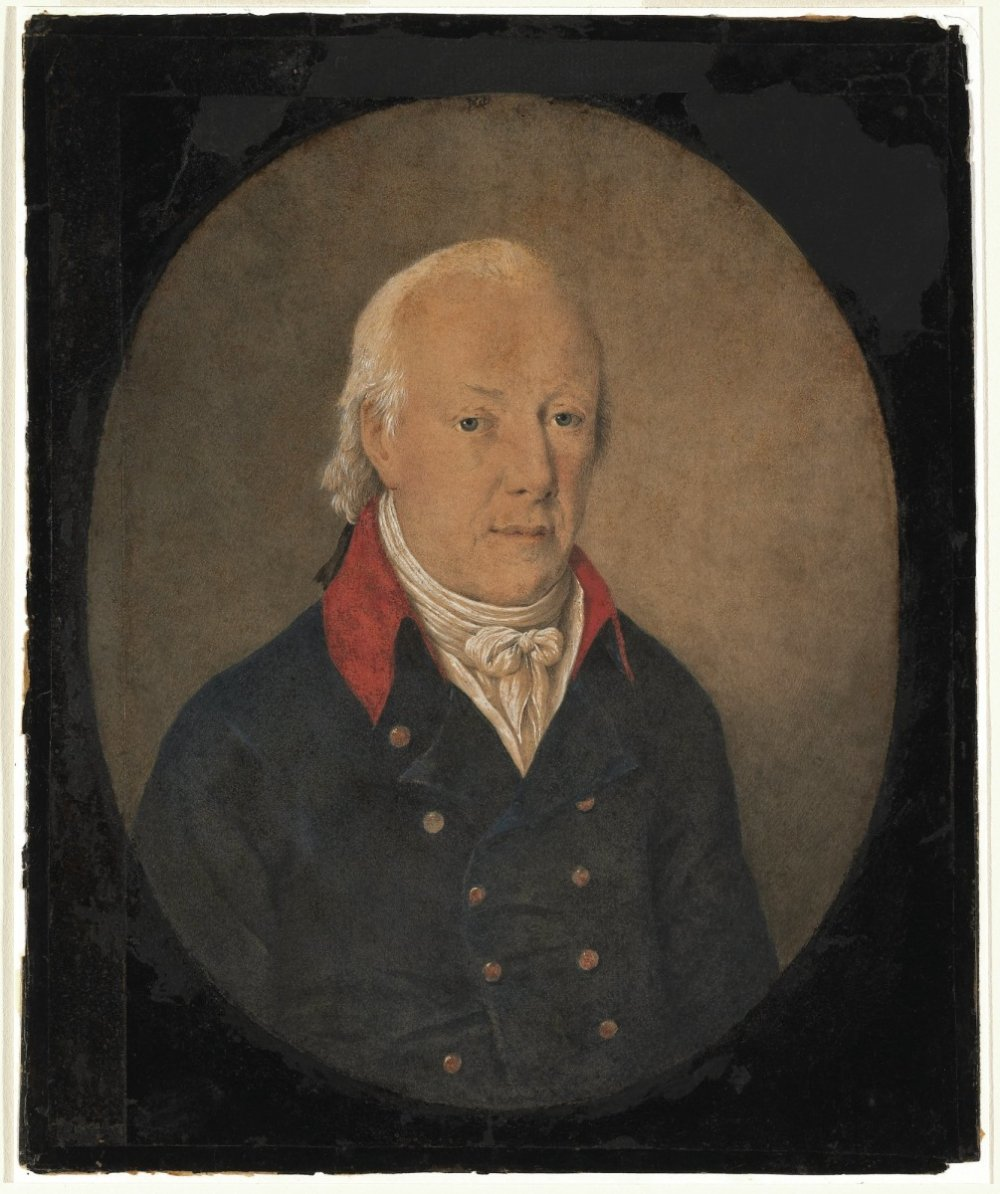
Daniel Robertson (c. 1804–1808)

Colonel Daniel Robertson (c. 1733 – 5 April 1810) was an officer in the British Army in North America, commandant of the British post at Michilimackinac, and a landowner in Chatham Township, Canada. Born in Scotland, he first joined the 42nd Regiment of Foot, also known as the "Black Watch," and was present at the British capture of Montreal in 1760, as well as the invasion of Martinique in 1762. During the American Revolutionary War, he was an officer in the 84th Regiment of Foot, another regiment of Scots known as the Royal Highland Emigrants. In 1779, he was appointed commandant of Fort Osgewatchie and oversaw Native American raids on American settlements on the Mohawk River.

From 1782, Robertson served as commandant of Fort Michilimackinac (later known as Fort Mackinac). He freed his black slaves, Jean Bonga and Marie-Jeanne Bonga, before leaving Mackinac Island for Montreal in 1787. "Robinson's Folly" at Mission Point on Mackinac Island was originally called "Robertson's Folly" after Captain Robertson.

== Early military career ==
Daniel Robertson was born in Dunkeld, Scotland. In April 1754, he was appointed as a surgeon's mate in the 42nd Regiment of Foot. The regiment was sent to North America in June 1756 and was first stationed at Albany in the Province of New York. In July 1756, Robertson received the rank of ensign.

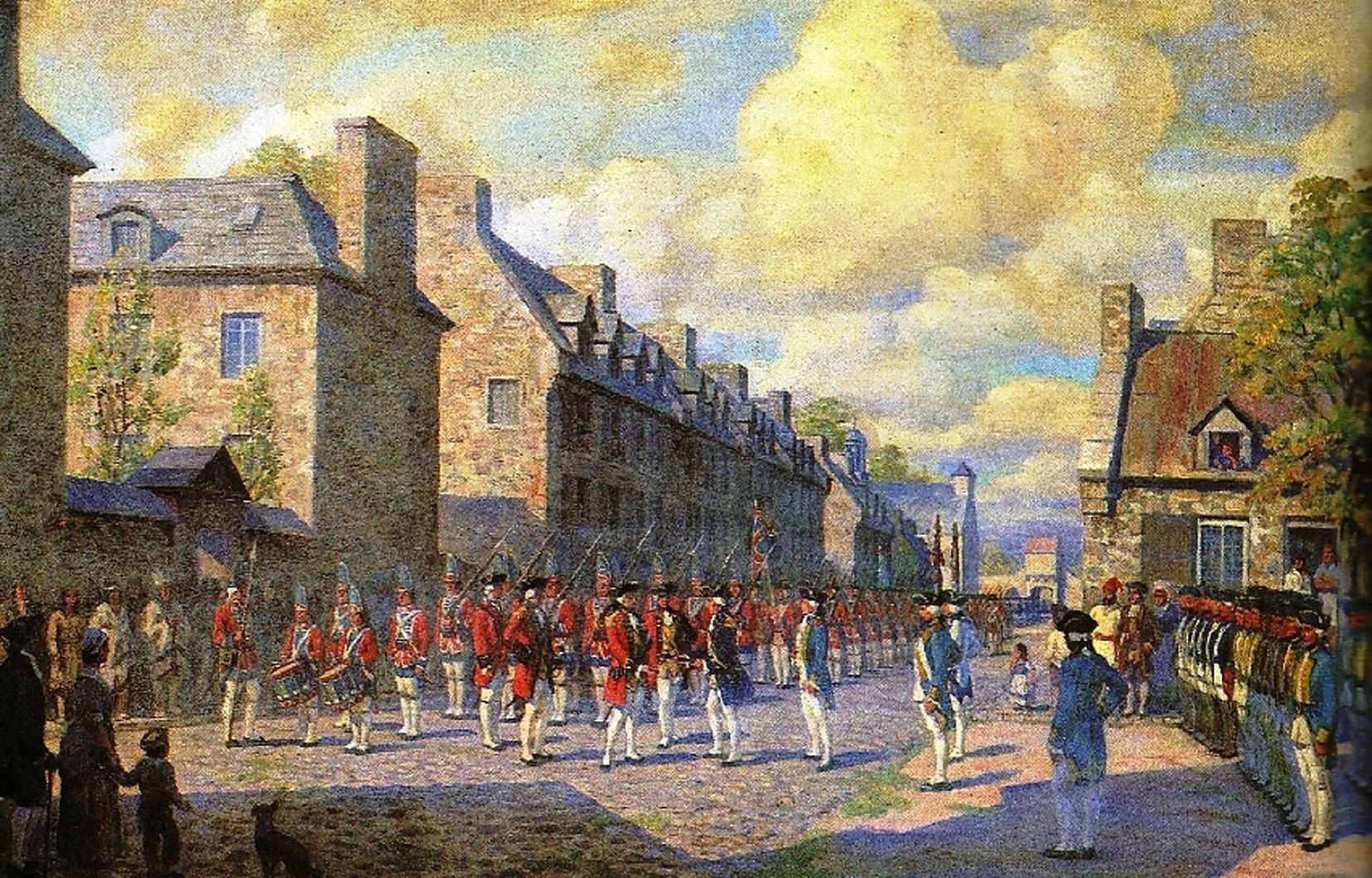
Robertson was present at the capture of Montreal in 1760

Robertson participated in the Montreal Campaign of 1760 and the British invasion of Martinique in 1762. On 29 April 1762, he purchased the rank of lieutenant in the British Army. After the capture of Havana in 1762, the 42nd Regiment returned to the mainland.

In the summer of 1763, Robertson went with his regiment to relieve Fort Pitt in present-day Pennsylvania, which was under siege by Native American forces during Pontiac's War. The 42nd Regiment fought in the Battle of Bushy Run under the command of Colonel Henry Bouquet.

Following the conclusion of the Seven Years' War, Robertson left the army and returned to Montreal.

== Family and life in Montreal ==
In 1760 or 1761, Daniel Robertson married Marie-Louise Réaume, the young widow of Joseph Fournerie de Vézon. His wife came from a prominent French Canadian merchant family.

Between 1763 and 1773, they had four children who survived to adulthood, including daughters Margaret, Charlotte and Elizabeth, and a son named John. Marie-Louise died in 1773. Their daughter Margaret Robertson married Montreal businessman Daniel Sutherland in 1781.

=== Medical practice ===
After leaving the 42nd Regiment, Daniel Robertson practiced medicine in Montreal and was one of the few British represented in the professions in Montreal.

=== Appointment as justice ===
In 1765, Robertson was appointed as a justice of the peace in Montreal. Through the 1760s, he was a highly active magistrate. In 1768, he served as a member of the grand jury at Montreal and was publicly commended by the other members for "your just and spirited Behaviour as a Magistrate and your indefatigable Care to bring Offenders to Justice."

However, he eventually became entangled in local politics around merchant disputes with the military, and was also accused of leading a campaign against his fellow justice Pierre du Calvet. Robertson and other British justices in Montreal ceased to act after 1770.

== American Revolutionary War ==
At the start of the American Revolutionary War, Daniel Robertson became a major in the Montreal militia. On 14 June 1775, he was appointed captain-lieutenant of the 1st Battalion of the 84th Regiment of Foot, also known as the Royal Highland Emigrants.

His company was sent to defend Fort St. Johns at Saint-Jean-sur-Richelieu from invasion by the Americans. The fort surrendered on 3 November 1775, and Robertson was taken to Connecticut as a prisoner. Following a prisoner exchange, he returned to the 84th Regiment in early 1777.

=== Indian raids in Mohawk River valley ===
In 1779, Robertson was appointed commandant at Fort Osgewatchie, a small British post near present-day Ogdensburg, New York. He oversaw Native American Indian raids on American settlements in the Mohawk Valley region.

In June 1782, Robertson led an attack that destroyed two mills and five houses on the Mohawk River. After the successful raid, he secured a commission for his son-in-law Daniel Sutherland as an ensign under his command.

== Post at Michilimackinac ==
On 13 August 1782, General Frederick Haldimand sent Captain Daniel Robertson to the British post at Michilimackinac in the newly expanded Province of Quebec. Robertson was accompanied by his son-in-law, as well as a committee of three men investigating the expenses of Lieutenant Governor Patrick Sinclair. Sinclair had started construction of a new fort on Mackinac Island and was accused of extravagance in distributing supplies to maintain British relations with the local Ojibwe and other Native American tribes.

On 18 September 1782, Sinclair left to settle his financial affairs, and Robertson formally assumed the post of commandant.

=== Indian affairs ===
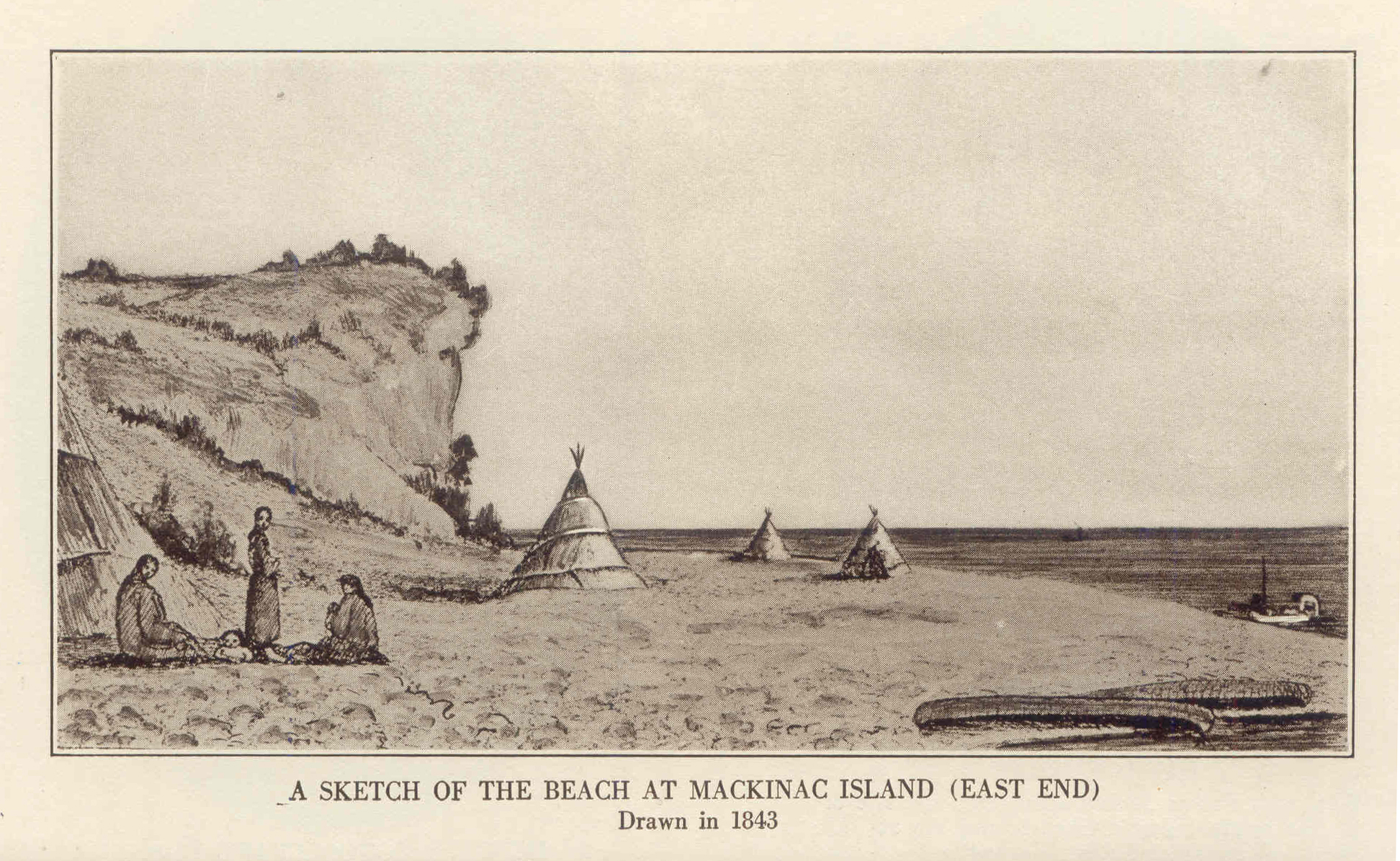
Mission Point beach at Mackinac Island

As the newly appointed commandant, Robertson received strict instructions to curtail expenses. He was informed that spending was permitted on completing the new Fort Michilimackinac (later referred to as Fort Mackinac), but that he should limit spending on Indian affairs. Like his predecessor, however, he quickly found that maintaining relations with Native American allies in the region was expensive and difficult to control. Every summer, approximately 4,000 Indians would arrived at Mackinac Island to trade with the British. They had grown accustomed to a certain level of British hospitality, and Robertson felt compelled to distribute gifts to them rather than anger such a large group.

In April 1783, he commissioned George McBeath and Charles-Michel Mouet de Langlade to visit Native American leaders around Prairie du Chien and spread the word that peace between the British and the American colonies was imminent, and that the Indians should end any inter-tribal hostilities. Robertson also sought to discourage their allies from coming to Michilimackinac, so that he would not have to continue supplying them with food, provisions and arms.

In September 1783, Robertson sent Jean Baptiste Cadotte and Ojibwe chief Matchekewis to Chequamegon Bay to broker peace between the Ojibwe and the Meskwaki and the Sioux. They were unsuccessful.

In 1784, Matchekewis returned to the fort on Mackinac Island to collect his annual distribution of supplies and was angered when Robertson refused, denouncing the deceitfulness of the British.

=== Mackinac Island after the war ===
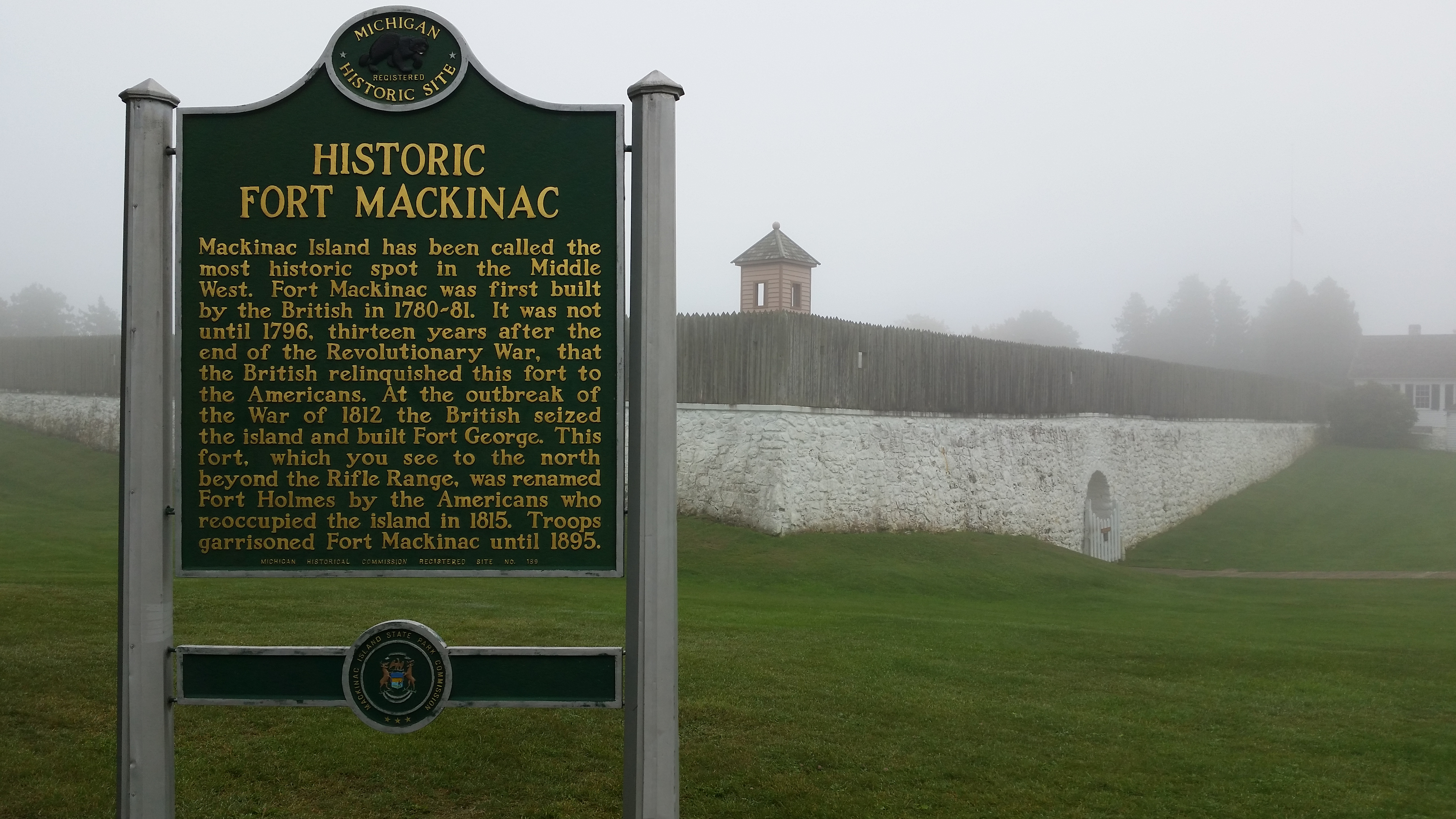
Fort Mackinac today

Upon learning that Mackinac Island would become part of the United States, Robertson grew concerned that he would need to evacuate the fort. In 1784, Robertson and McBeath searched for a new site for a British post on the north shore of Lake Superior. Robertson recommended a location near present-day Thessalon, Ontario to Governor Haldimand and also suggested engaging his son-in-law, Montreal merchant Daniel Sutherland, to supply building materials for a new fort.

However, as disputes over the exact location of the Canadian border continued, the British decided against abandoning Mackinac Island, which would remain under British rule for 13 years following the Treaty of Paris. In 1784, Robertson was succeeded as commandant by Lieutenant George Clowes, and was placed on half pay. He applied unsuccessfully for the position of Indian agent for Michilimackinac, but remained at Mackinac Island until the summer of 1787, when he returned to Montreal.

Between 1785 and 1787, Robertson secured several land grants for his daughters Charlotte and Elizabeth, as well as James Grant, Simon McTavish, and Margaret McBeath.

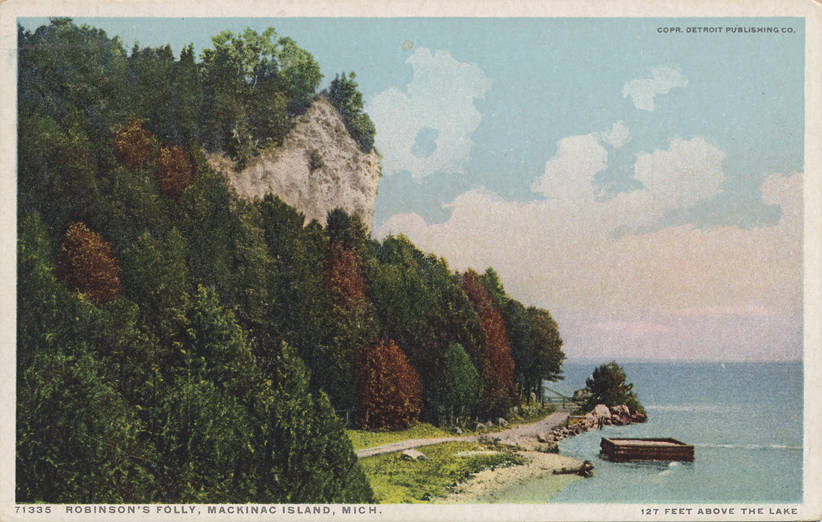
Robinson's Folly, Mackinac Island

=== Robertson's Folly (now Robinson's Folly) ===
According to local legend, Captain Daniel Robertson built a small summer house on an overhanging cliff at the southeast corner of Mackinac Island, now called Mission Point. Robertson was said to have entertained his fellow officers at his summer house, where they enjoyed smoking pipes and cigars, and drinking wine. However, after a few years, part of the cliff including the summer house collapsed to the base of the rocks, leaving a mass of debris on the beach. For over a century, the cliff was called "Robertson's Folly" but eventually became known as "Robinson's Folly," a corruption of Robertson's name.

=== Relationship to Bonga family ===
In 1781, Jean Bonga and Marie-Jeanne Bonga were captured in the Illinois country as prisoners during the American Revolutionary War. According to one of their grandchildren, they were probably then sold to Indian traders at Mackinac. After arriving at Mackinac, Captain Robertson retained them as slaves and wrote that he refused to return them to "a set of Spanish rascals."

Before leaving Michilimackinac in 1787, Robertson freed Jean and Marie-Jeanne Bonga, who became well known tavern keepers on Mackinac Island. Their children and grandchildren went on to become successful in the North American fur trade.

== Later life in Montreal and Chatham ==
=== Release of other slaves ===
On 16 November 1787, Captain Robertson also emancipated his slave Hilaire Lamour as a reward for his "25 years of true and faithful service." Robertson had bought him in Martinique during the Seven Years' War. However, Robertson insisted that Lamour had to pay for the release of his wife Catherine.

On 3 December 1787, Lamour paid Robertson £100 for Catherine – the highest recorded price for a female slave in Montreal. Lamour most likely borrowed money to raise the sum, which meant that Catherine technically became her husband's slave and subject to seizure by his creditors in payment of his debt. Hilaire finally succeeded in emancipating Catherine Lamour on 26 December 1787.

=== Promotion to colonel ===
After his return to Montreal, Robertson was promoted to the rank of major in the British Army in 1790. In February 1793, he was appointed captain in the 60th Regiment of Foot and became a lieutenant-colonel in March 1794. He finally advanced to the rank of colonel on 1 January 1798.

In 1793, Robertson was elected an honorary member of the Beaver Club, an exclusive gentlemen's club for fur traders in Montreal. In 1799, he was reappointed as justice of the peace, but appears not to have been active.

=== Land ownership ===
By 1806, Robertson had acquired over 5,000 acres of land in Chatham Township on the east bank of the Ottawa River. He invested in developing his land to attract settlers. By 1804, there were 43 families comprising 170 people living on his properties. In 1806, he gave 96 acres of land to Anglican missionary Richard Bradford for the establishment of a church in the area.

However, Robertson's financial situation was precarious. In 1802, 1804 and 1806, Sheriff Edward William Gray seized much of Robertson's property in Chatham and on the Serpentine River. In 1810, Bradford purchased a further 3,000 acres from Robertson's estate.

== Death ==
Due to his declining health, in December 1809, Robertson went to live with his daughter Margaret and Daniel Sutherland. He died on 5 April 1810 in Montreal and was buried with military honours at the Scotch Presbyterian Church.
