= Faribault =

Faribault is a French surname that may refer to:

== Persons ==
- Alexander Faribault (1806–1882), American trading post owner and territorial legislator
- E.R. Faribault, Geological Survey of Canada
- George-Barthélemy Faribault (1789–1866), Canadian archaeologist
- Jean-Baptiste Faribault (1775–1860), American fur trader
- Joseph-Édouard Faribault (1773–1859), notary and political figure in Lower Canada
- Marcel Faribault (1908–1972), Canadian notary, businessman and administrator

== Places ==
=== Canada ===
- Faribault River, a tributary of the Chibougamau River in Quebec

=== United States ===
- Faribault County, Minnesota
  - Faribault County Courthouse
- Faribault, Minnesota, a city in Rice County Minnesota
  - Minnesota Correctional Facility – Faribault
  - Faribault Woolen Mills
  - Alexander Faribault House

== Other uses ==
- USS Faribault (AK-179) was an Alamosa-class cargo ship acquired by the U.S. Navy during the final months of World War II.
