= Blind Department Building and Dow Hall, State School for the Blind =

- Formerly listed on the U.S. National Register of Historic Places
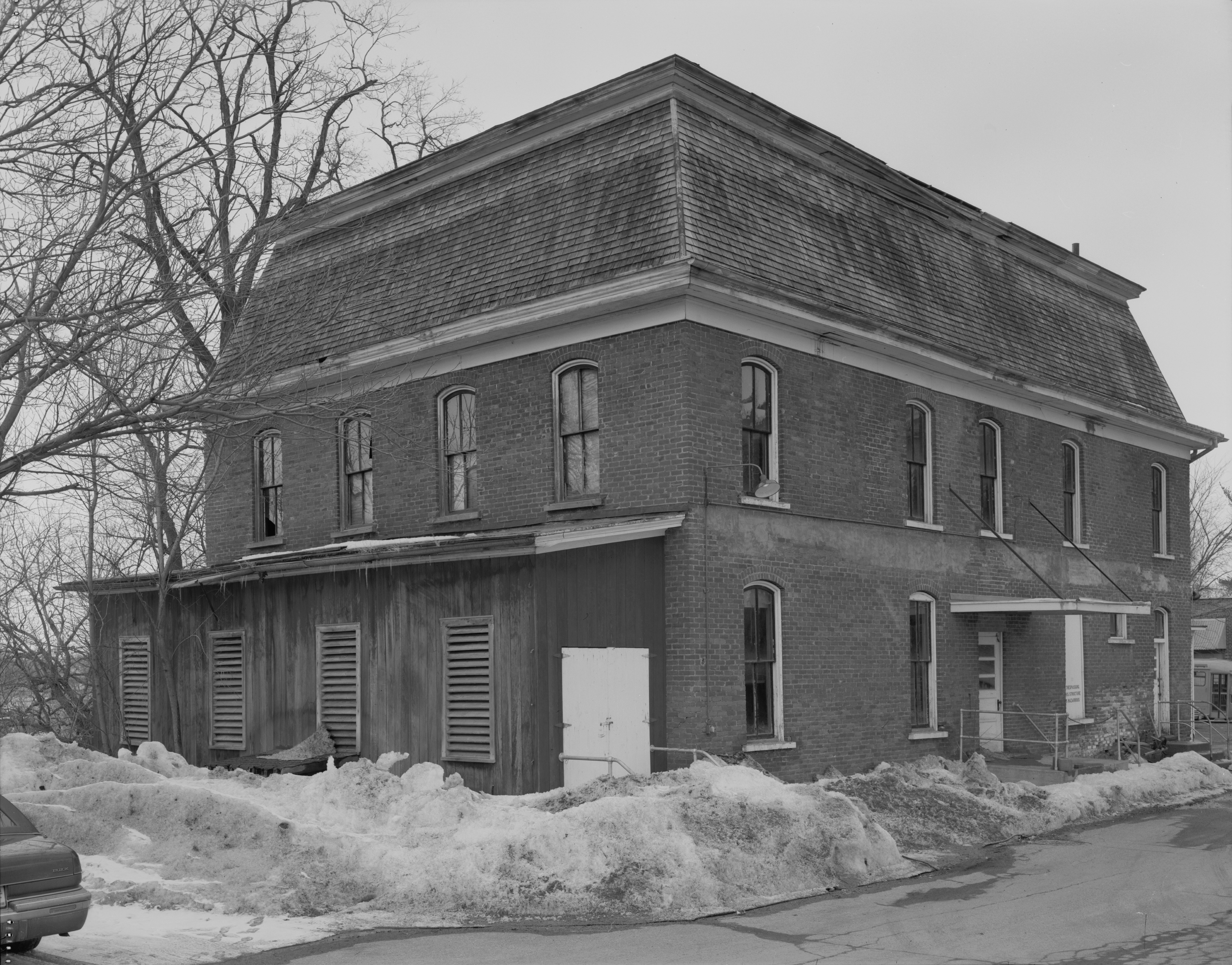
- The Blind Department Building – originally the home of Alexander Faribault – built in 1856

- Location within Minnesota Location within the United States
- Location: Faribault, Minnesota
- Coordinates: 44°17′12.02″N 93°15′36.21″W
- Built: 1874
- Architect: Waite & Kingsley; Monroe & Shiere
- Architectural style: Classical Revival, French Second Empire
- NRHP reference No.: 90001092

Significant dates
- Added to NRHP: July 25, 1990
- Removed from NRHP: November 7, 2016

Blind Department Building and Dow Hall, State School for the Blind were two buildings that were part of the Minnesota State Academy for the Blind, a public school administered by the state in Faribault, Minnesota, United States. The two structures, Dow Hall and the Blind Department Building, were significant components of a system of state-administered special education for the physically and mentally disabled segments of the population. Both buildings have been demolished, and their listing was removed from the National Register of Historic Places in 2016.

== Blind Department building ==
Alexander Faribault moved into his impressive Second Empire home on the east side of the Straight River in 1856. In 1874, the home was sold to the state to house the State School for the Blind.

== Dow Hall ==
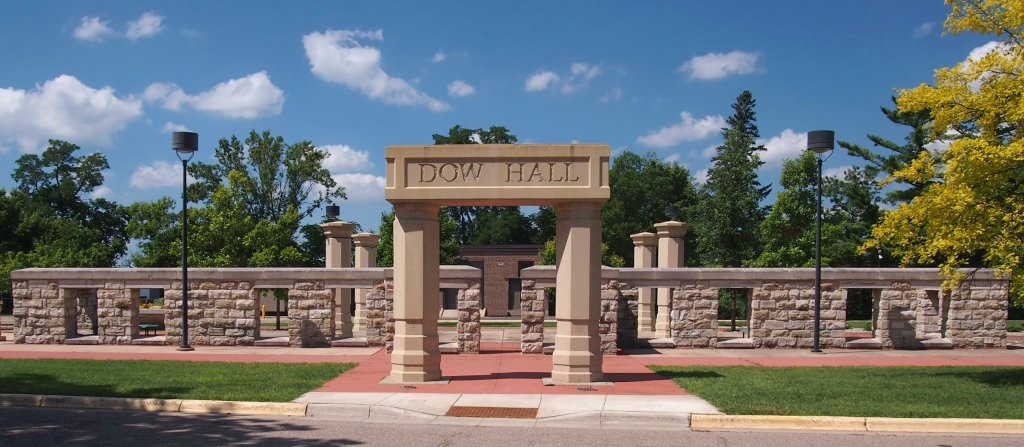
Memorial preserving the Dow Hall foundation

Dow Hall (1883) was built specifically to house the School for the Blind. The building's construction was indicative not only that education was worthwhile for people with disabilities, but also that differing disabilities required programs tailored to the students' specific needs.

The building was demolished some time after 1996 due to potential safety hazards. The legislation authorizing the demolition specified that a historical marker must be placed at the site with artifacts of the historic building. The stonework of the ground floor of the foundation is visible at the site.
