= Alexander Faribault House =

Historic house in Minnesota, United States

- U.S. National Register of Historic Places
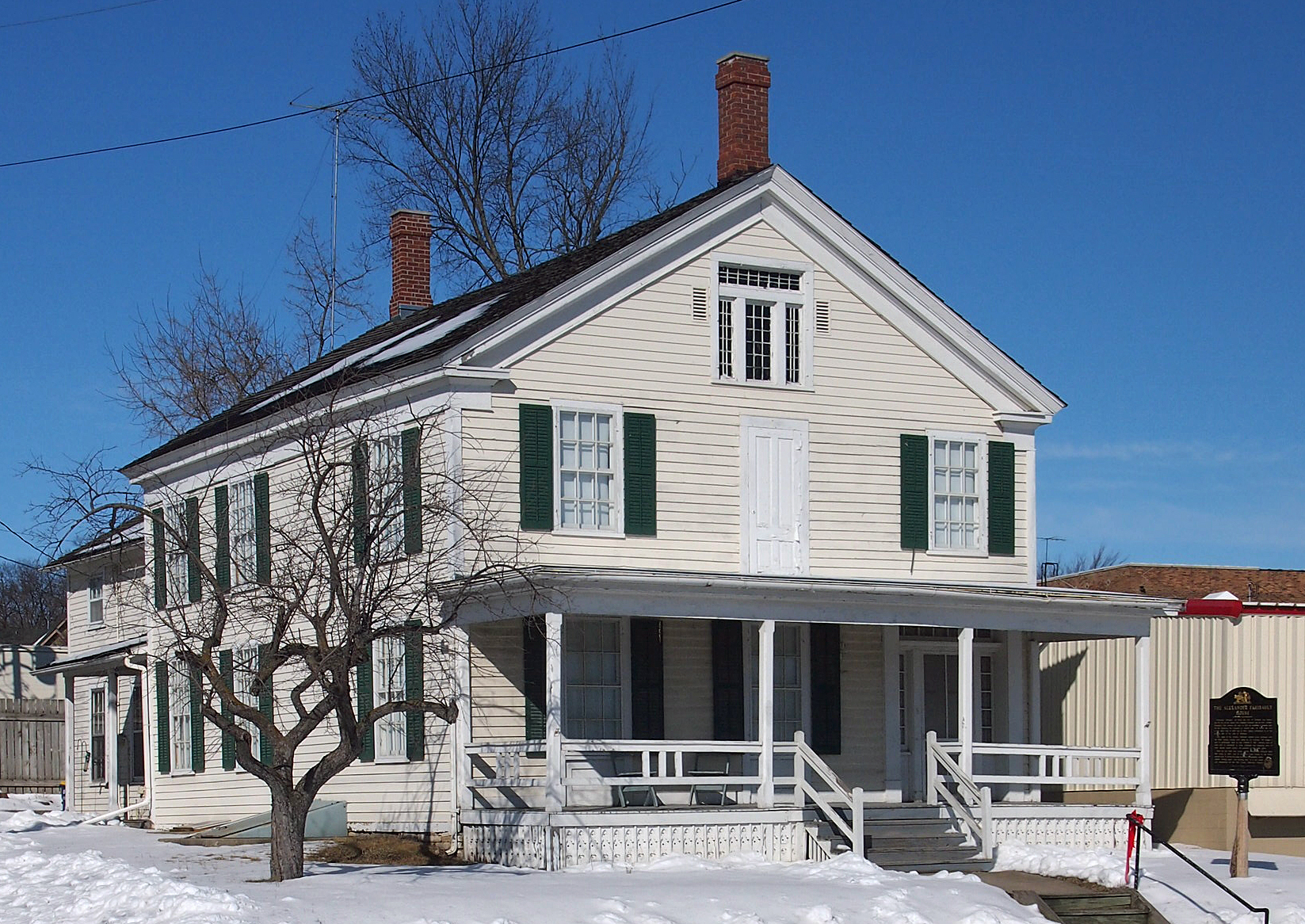
- The Alexander Faribault House from the east

- Location within Minnesota Location within the United States
- Location: 12 1st Avenue NE; Faribault, Minnesota
- Coordinates: 44°17′27.7″N 93°16′1.5″W
- Built: 1853
- Architect: Alexander Faribault
- Architectural style: Greek Revival
- NRHP reference No.: 70000309
- Added to NRHP: September 22, 1970

The Alexander Faribault House is a historic house museum in Faribault, Minnesota, United States. Built in 1853, it was the first wood-frame house constructed in Rice County, Minnesota. It was built by fur trader Alexander Faribault in the Greek Revival style. Besides serving as a house, it also served as a civic center, polling place, and a church. The local address of the house is 12 First Avenue, Faribault, MN. The house was listed on the National Register of Historic Places in 1970.

== History ==
Alexander Faribault, son of Jean Baptiste Faribault, was a contemporary of Henry Hastings Sibley and served as his secretary for a time. In 1835, Alexander Faribault set up a trading venture at the confluence of the Straight River and the Cannon River. He had a relationship of mutual respect with the Dakota Indians with whom he traded, even to the degree of sheltering friendly Indians during the Dakota War of 1862.

In 1853, he built a large frame house. His house reflected his prosperity, with nine bedrooms, a music room, a parlor, a sitting room, an office, a kitchen, a summer kitchen, and a sewing room. Part of his wealth came from "traders' claims" stemming from the Treaty of Traverse des Sioux, but he was also the proprietor of a sawmill and a flour mill.

In turn, he was generous to the community, donating $3,000 to Bishop Henry Benjamin Whipple for the church and for Shattuck School. He also donated land for the Seabury Divinity School.

He served as a delegate to the Minnesota Territorial Legislature and remained friends with Henry Mower Rice and Henry Hastings Sibley, even though Rice and Sibley were personal and political enemies.

== See also ==
- National Register of Historic Places listings in Rice County, Minnesota
