= MSAB =

MSAB may refer to:

- Minnesota State Academy for the Blind, a public school in Faribault, Minnesota, United States
- Muwaffaq Salti Air Base, a military installation of the Royal Jordanian Air Force in Azraq, Zarqa Governorate, Jordan
