= Erythronium propullans =

Conservation status
- Critically Imperiled (NatureServe)

- Endangered (ESA)

Scientific classification
- Kingdom: Plantae
- Clade: Tracheophytes
- Clade: Angiosperms
- Clade: Monocots
- Order: Liliales
- Family: Liliaceae
- Subfamily: Lilioideae
- Genus: Erythronium
- Species: E. propullans

Binomial name
- Erythronium propullans A.Gray

Species of flowering plant

Erythronium propullans, the Minnesota dwarf trout lily, Minnesota adder's tongue or Minnesota fawnlily, is a rare plant endemic to the Cannon River and North Fork Zumbro River watersheds in Rice County, Goodhue County and the extreme northern edge of Steele County, Minnesota, in the United States. The plant is closely related to the white trout lily (Erythronium albidum) and is believed to have evolved less than 9,000 years ago. It was listed as an endangered species of the United States under the Endangered Species Act in 1986.

The plants flower in the spring at the same time as hepaticas, Dutchman's breeches, bloodroot, and other spring wildflowers. Nerstrand-Big Woods State Park, River Bend Nature Center, and several tracts owned by The Nature Conservancy protect portions of its habitat.

== Description ==
Erythronium propullans is a perennial growing from a small bulb. It has smaller flowers than E. albidum, often only 1 cm long with a pinkish tint to them. The fruits are also smaller than those of E. albidum, with the mature fruits nodding. Offshoots are produced by flowering plants grow from the stem above the bulbs unlike E. albidum which are produced from the bulbs. Erythronium propullans produces one stolon below the soil surface on the midway point of the stem on blooming plants; that stolon then produces a new bulb. On non-blooming plants, 1 to 3 stolons are produced directly from the bulbs, each ending in a new clone.

== Habitat ==
Erythronium propullans is found only in two counties in Minnesota (the only strictly endemic plant species in the state.) It is typically a woodland species most commonly found on north-facing slopes above or near streambeds. It is found in areas with dense shade in the summer, but completes its growing period early in the year before trees are fully leafed out.

== Discovery ==
The lily was first noted by Mary Hedges, a high school science instructor at St. Mary's School (now Shattuck-St. Mary's) in Faribault, Minnesota, and then formally listed as a new species by botanist Asa Gray in 1871. It is listed as both a federally and state endangered species.

== Reproduction ==
Research suggests that E. propullans rarely reproduces from seed on its own, but is highly dependent on vegetative reproduction, or limited cross pollination with Erythronium albidum, thus limiting population growth and spread of the species.

== Threats ==
The historical and current distribution of E. propullans is limited and the primary threats to the species include, development and flooding along the floodplains and ridges where it currently exists, trampling and recreational use impacts, as well as habitat changes brought on by invasive species such as common buckthorn (Rhamnus cathartica). Since the plants form large colonies of 100 or more clonal plants, the true number of distinctive individuals may number only around 400. Attempts to propagate the species by humans have generally been unsuccessful.
