= David Wallace Illsley =

American politician

David Wallace Illsley (March 10, 1864 – January 5, 1951) was an American farmer and politician.

Illsley was born in Nova Scotia, British North America. He emigrated with his parents to the United States in 1871 and settled in Rice County, Minnesota. Illsley went to the Rice County elementary and secondary schools. He lived in Faribault, Minnesota with his wife and family and was a farmer. He served as the township assessor, the township supervisor, and the road supervisor for the Bridgewater Township, Rice County, Minnesota. Illsley also served on the Rice County School Board. He served in the Minnesota Senate from 1923 to 1926. His son Ralph H. Illsley also served in the Minnesota Legislature. Illsley died at St. Luke Hospital in Faribault, Minnesota.
