= Pelagie Faribault =

Woman of Dakota heritage who received Pike Island in a 1820 treaty

- Born: 1783; Prairie du Chien, Wisconsin, US
- Died: June 19, 1847 (aged 63–64)
- Burial place: Calvary Cemetery, Faribault, Minnesota
- Other names: Kinne Hanse Ainse, Pelagie Hause, Pelagie Ainse, Elizabeth Pelagie Ainse Faribault
- Spouse: Jean Baptiste Faribault
- Children: 8, including Alexander Faribault

Pelagie Faribault (1783 – June 19, 1847) was a woman of Dakota and European descent who received Wita Tanka (Pike Island) from her Dakota family as part of an 1820 treaty with the United States. She was the wife of fur trader Jean-Baptiste Faribault and mother of Alexander Faribault.

== Biography ==
Pelagie Faribault was born in 1783 at Prairie du Chien to fur trader and Indian agent Joseph Ainse and a Dakota woman, who may have been Mdewakaton. Ainse was the son of French parents and born on Mackinac Island in 1744. Having a child with a Dakota woman likely served to solidify his trade relationship with his wife's band, and allowed him to claim kinship ties, a theme which would continue with Pelagie's own marriage. Records also refer to Pelagie Faribault's name as Kinne Hanse Ainse, Pelagie Hause, Pelagie Ainse, and Elizabeth Pelagie Ainse Faribault.

Pelagie married twice. In her first marriage, she was widowed suddenly. Soon after, she married Jean-Baptise Faribault in the Dakota way. They often lived apart, as was typical for fur-trade families. Together, they had eight children, including Alexander (b. 1806), Lucie-Annie (b. 1808), Oliver (b.1815), David-Frederic (b. 1816), Amelia Rene (b. 1820), Marie-Louise (b. 1822), Philippe (b. 1826), and Frederic-Daniel (b. 1829). Several of her children remained involved with the fur trade, with Alexander becoming a fur trader himself, and Lucie-Annie marrying fur trader Alexis Bailly. Her son David married a Dakota woman, Winona, Nancy McClure, and the children of this family became leaders among the Flandreau Dakota.

The family first lived at Prairie du Chien, before moving to Wita Tanka (Big Island, also known as Pike Island) around 1819 or 1820, but they dealt with flooding issues as Jean-Baptiste attempted to farm. Colonel Henry Leavenworth had encouraged the move to the island. In the mid-1820s, Pelagie, Jean-Baptiste, and their younger children moved to Mendota.

Pelagie's relationships with her Dakota kin and knowledge of Dakota language and culture likely assisted her husband Jean-Baptiste's work in the fur trade, providing social connections which helped with trade. Pelagie's responsibilities would also have included hospitality, including sleeping accommodations and food, when the Faribault's hosted travelers and other traders, such as Philander Prescott and Henry Leavenworth, the latter of whom recalled" the very polite and hospitable manner in which I was treated while with you."

When Jean-Baptiste was stabbed in the back at his trading post in 1833, Pelagie traveled thirty-five miles overnight to help him recover. Also in 1833, Jean-Baptiste purchased a Black woman as enslaved labor for the Faribault family, something that was common around Fort Snelling at the time. In June 1840, the Faribault family moved into a larger stone house in Mendota,150 yards from Henry Sibley's house. That home is now part of Sibley Historic Site, managed by the Minnesota Historical Society.

Pelagie died on June 19, 1847. Her husband and several of her children moved to Faribault, Minnesota, founded by her son Alexander, after her death. Pelagie is buried at Calvary Cemetery in Faribault.

== Wita Tanka (Pike Island) ==
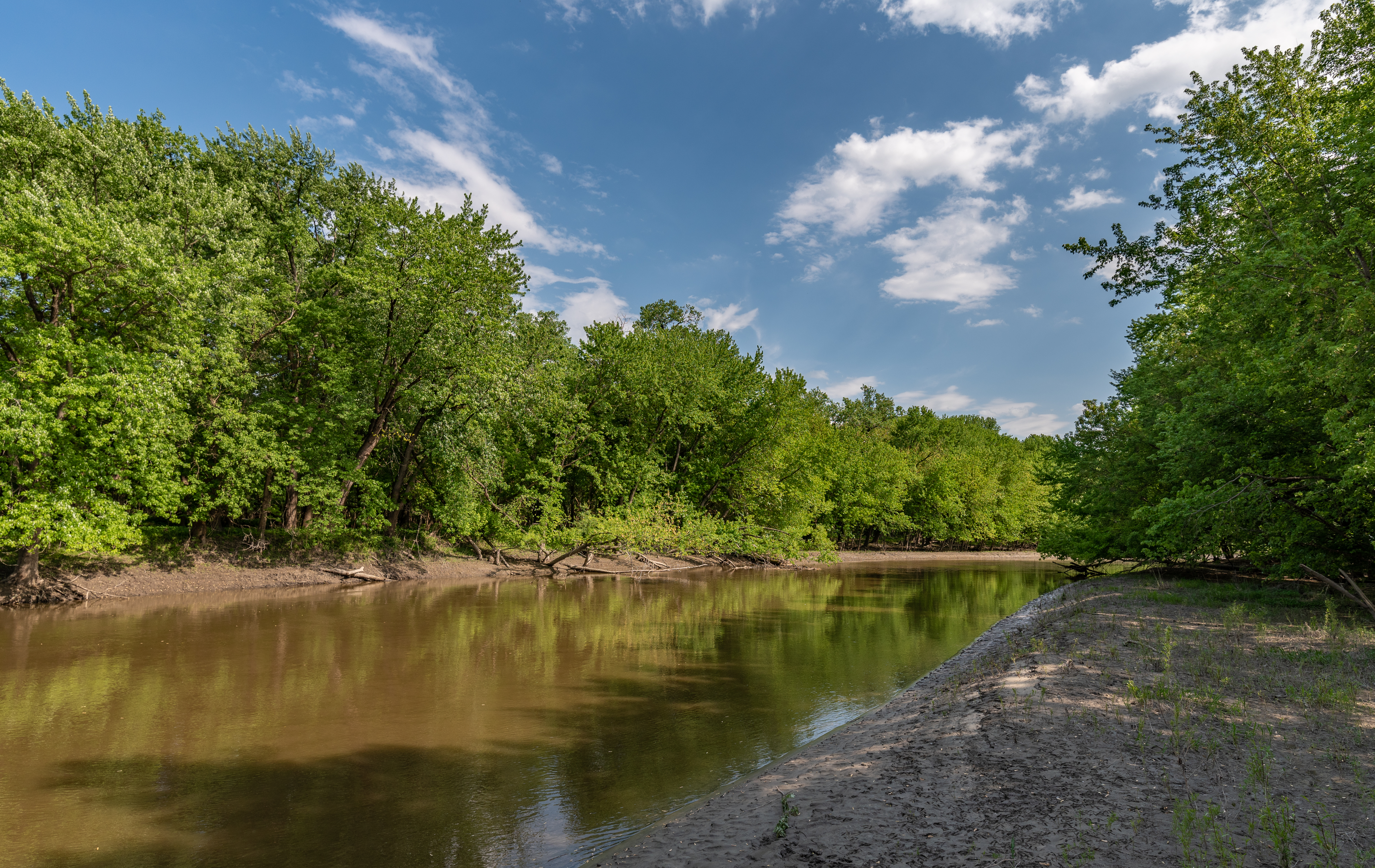
Minnesota River at Wita Tanka (Pike Island)

On August 9, 1820, the Dakota and the United States signed a treaty at Coldwater Spring which ceded Dakota land for the construction of a U.S. fort at the confluence of the Minnesota and Mississippi rivers. Henry Leavenworth, interpreter Duncan Campbell, Indian agent Lawrence Taliaferro, Jean-Baptiste Faribault, and 22 Dakota men were treaty attendees, which was agreed upon by the end of the day. Included in the treaty was a provision to set aside the 320-acre piece of land at the center of the confluence - Wita Tanka, now known as Pike Island - for Pelagie Faribault, using her name. At the time, the Faribault family was living on the island, and her Dakota relatives wanted her to have the island. Traditional Dakota culture gives women rights to land and home places, for the privilege to use and share the land and its resources. The treaty was never ratified or proclaimed by the president.

An 1837 treaty between the US and the Dakota did not acknowledge Pelagie's ownership of Wita Tanka, ceding the land back to the U.S. government. Letters from 1838 show advocates for the Faribaults, such as Samuel C. Stambaugh and Alexis Bailly, asking for compensation for the land, and described Pelagie as influential and generous in the Dakota community.

In 1858, eleven years after Pelagie died, the U.S. government paid Jean-Baptiste Faribault $12,000 for the island.
