= Minnesota State Academies =

Residential schools for disabled children

Coordinates: 44°17′51″N 93°15′38″W

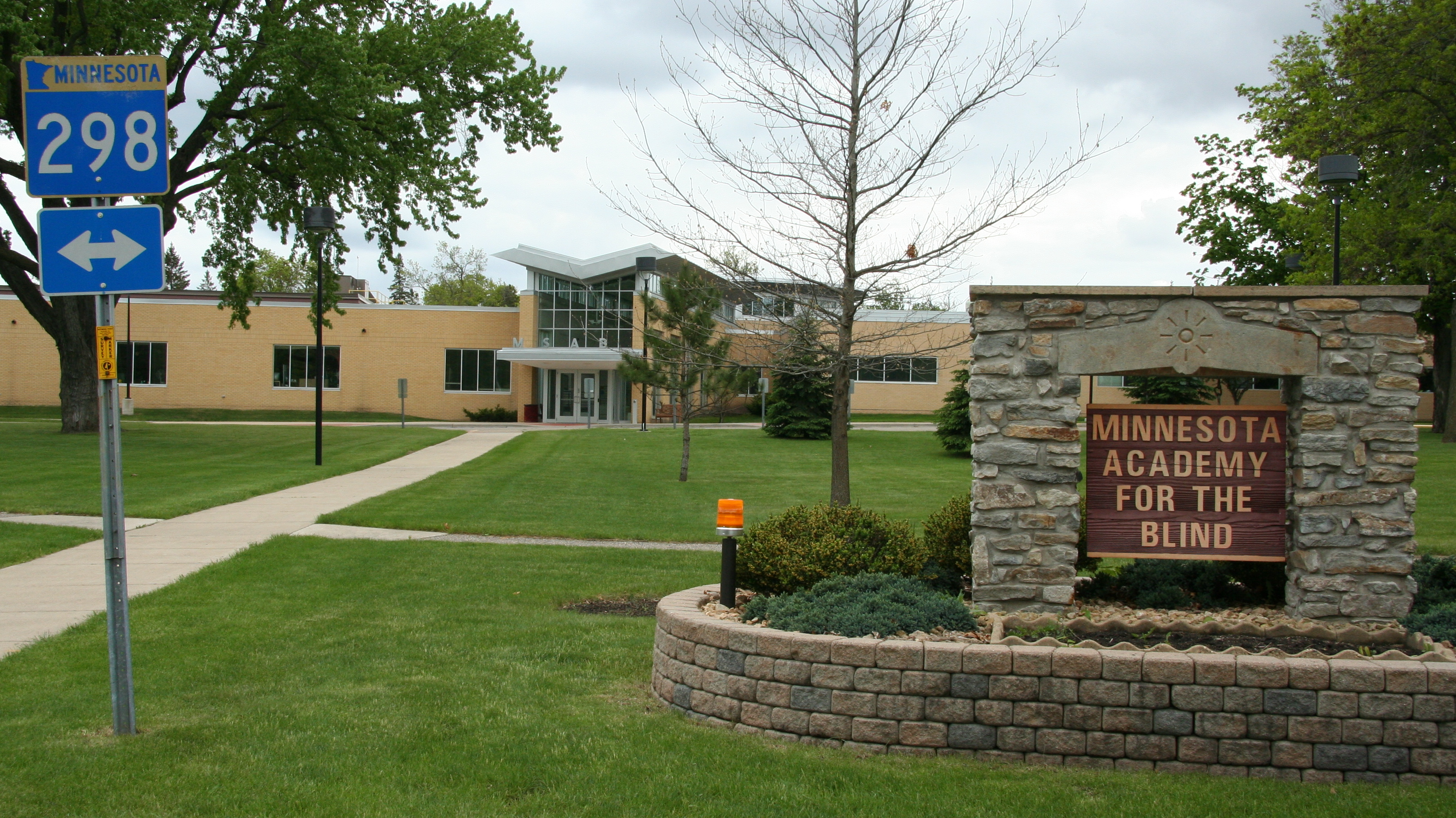
Minnesota Academy for the Blind main entrance on State Highway 298

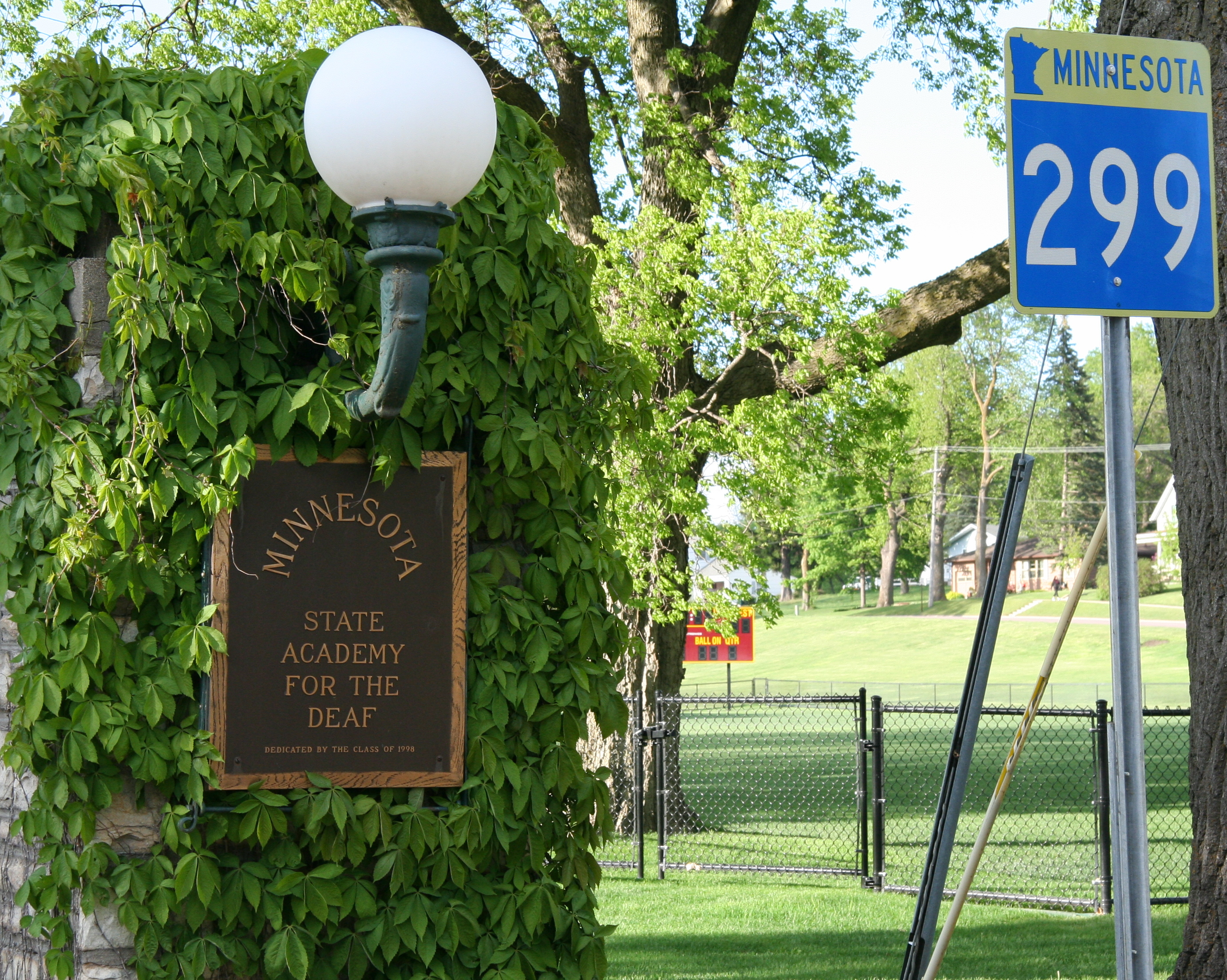
Minnesota Academy for the Deaf main entrance on State Highway 299

The Minnesota State Academy for the Deaf and the Blind oversees two state funded public schools: the Minnesota State Academy for the Blind and the Minnesota State Academy for the Deaf. Both schools were established by the Minnesota Legislature in 1858. MSAD Opened in 1863, followed by MSAB in 1866.

Today, the Minnesota State Academies provide specialized educational services for students who are Deaf, Hard of Hearing, DeafBlind, Blind and Visually Impaired, from birth though age 22. In addition to the usual daytime educational programs, both academies offer residential options and state outreach services to support students, families, educators, and school districts throughout Minnesota.

The campuses are located approximately one mile apart in Faribault, overlooking the Cannon River.

Several campus buildings are listed on the National Register of Historic Places, including Blind Department Building and Dow Hall at MSAB, as well as the Tate Hall and Noyes Hall at MSAD, recognizing the academies' longstanding contributions to education in Minnesota.
