= Thomas Scott Buckham Memorial Library =

- U.S. National Register of Historic Places
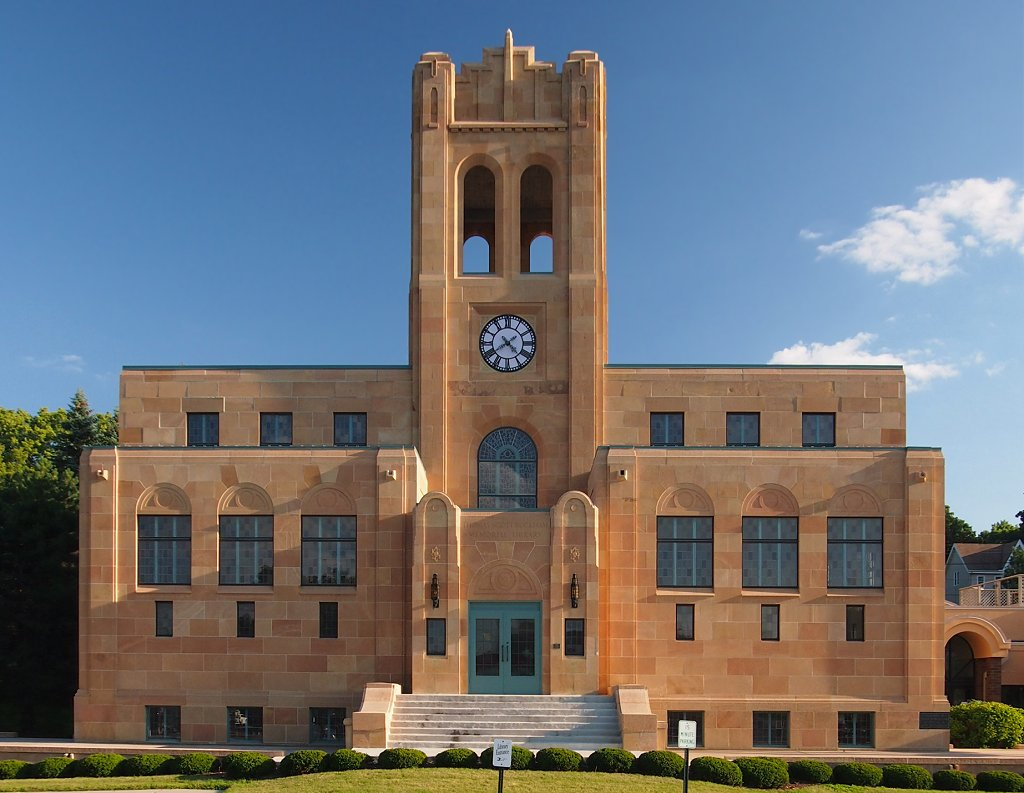
- The Buckham Memorial Library from the north

- Location within Minnesota
- Location: Central Ave. and Division St. Faribault, Minnesota
- Coordinates: 44°17′23.95″N 93°16′4.02″W
- Built: 1930
- Architect: Charles Buckham
- Architectural style: Art Deco
- MPS: Rice County MRA
- NRHP reference No.: 82003008
- Added to NRHP: April 6, 1982

Thomas Scott Buckham Memorial Library

Collection
- Size: 106,878

Access and use
- Circulation: 245,961
- Population served: 18,615

Other information
- Budget: $844,986
- Director: Delane James

The Thomas Scott Buckham Memorial Library is a historic library in Faribault, Minnesota, United States.

== History ==
The public library as a tax-supported institution in Faribault dates from 1897, when it was housed in the City Hall building. Mrs. Anna Buckham gave the Thomas Scott Buckham Memorial Library building to the City of Faribault in memory of her husband. The cornerstone was laid in September 1929, and the dedication of the building took place on July 20, 1930.

== Architecture ==
The library's architecture has Greek themes; Buckham was an avid reader and scholar of Greek literature. A stained glass window made by Charles Jay Connick was emplaced in the building's tower. The second floor has a Greek mural painted by Alfred J. Hyslop, which depicts scenes from Athens, Sparta, Delphi, and Olympia.
