= Alexander Faribault =

American politician (1806–1882)

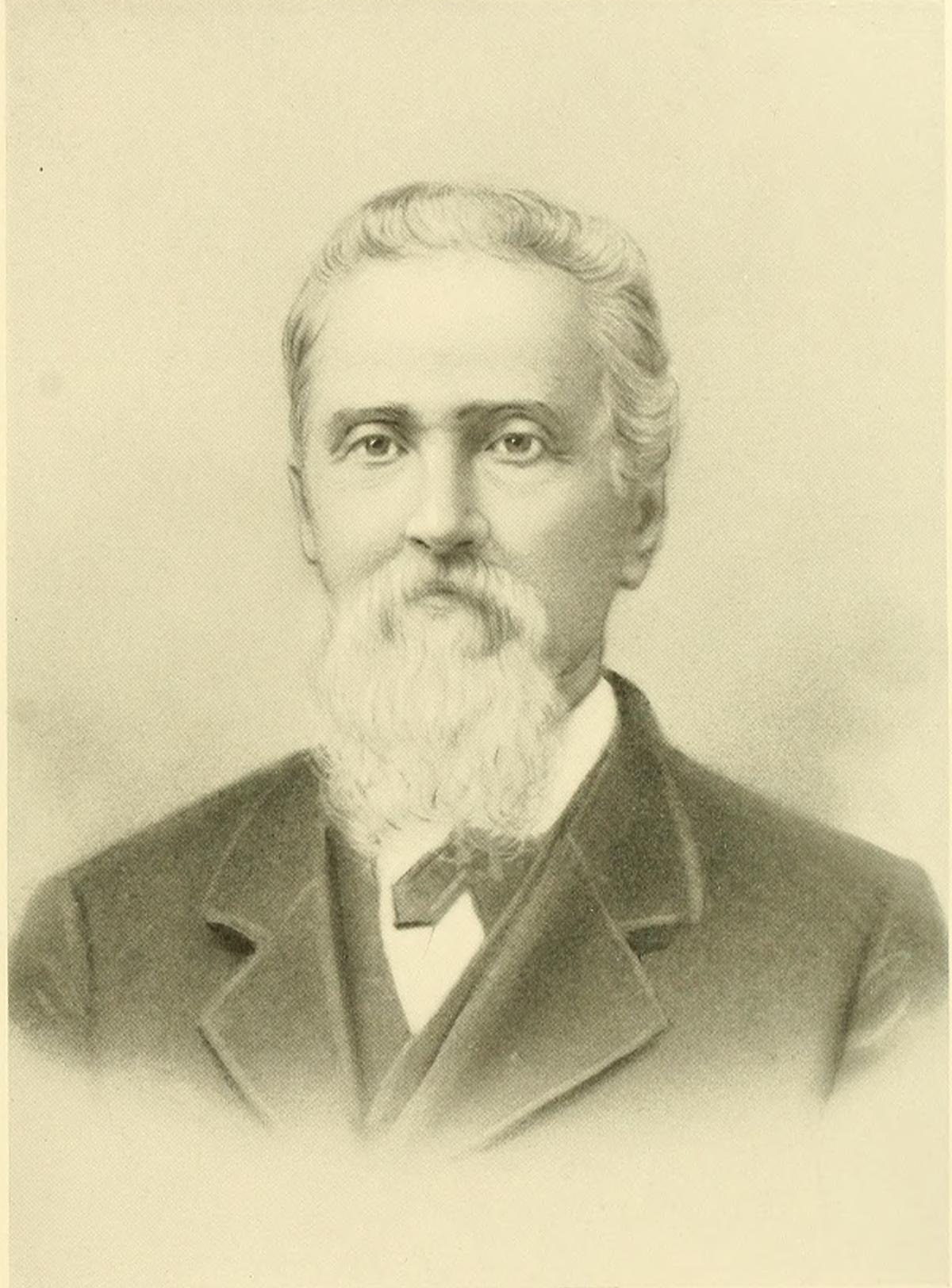
- Portrait of Alexander Faribault

Member of the 2nd Minnesota Territorial Legislature House of Representatives
- In office January 1, 1851 – January 6, 1852
- Preceded by: Alexis Bailly
- Succeeded by: Antoine Blanc Gingras

Personal details
- Born: June 22, 1806 Prairie du Chien, Michigan Territory, U.S.
- Died: April 22, 1882 (aged 75) Faribault, Minnesota, U.S.
- Resting place: Calvary Cemetery Faribault, MN
- Spouse: Mary Elizabeth Graham (m. 1825)
- Children: 10
- Parent: Jean-Baptiste Faribault Pelagie Faribault

Alexander Faribault (June 22, 1806 – November 28, 1882) was an American fur trading post operator with the American Fur Company and Minnesota territorial legislator who helped to found Faribault, Minnesota, and was its first postmaster.

== Early life and fur trade ==
Born in Prairie du Chien, Michigan Territory, his father was the fur trapper Jean-Baptiste Faribault. His mother was Elizabeth Pelagie Ainse, a half-Dakota daughter of Joseph-Louis Ainse, a British superintendent at Mackinac. He was the eldest of eight and considered mixed-blood. By 1819, the Faribault family moved to Pike Island, near Fort Snelling at the behest of Colonel Henry Leavenworth.

Faribault began clerking with the American Fur Company at age 12. By 1822, Faribault had become a licensed fur trader with the American Fur Company. He was granted a license to set up a trading post on the St. Peters (Minnesota) River. He traded at Traverse des Sioux, Lake Elysian in Waseca County, as well as in what is now Rice County.

Faribault married Mary Elizabeth Graham in 1825. Mary was a member of another prominent French-Dakota family. This helped contribute to Faribault's successful business enterprises. Together, they had ten children.

Around 1827, Faribault travelled for the first time to the Cannon River Valley where he traded with the Wahpekute, the local band of Dakota. By 1834, the trading post had grown in popularity and within several years, Faribault re-located it to the site of modern-day Faribault.

== Early Faribault ==
Alexander Faribault built his the first log-cabin structures in what is now Rice County in the 1830s or 1840s. By 1851, he owned a trading post and served in the Minnesota Territorial House of Representatives. On January 6, 1851, some members of the Minnesota Territorial House of Representatives objected to Alexander Faribault’s election over concerns that noneligible voters were allowed to vote in his election. A special committee of the Minnesota Territorial House of Representatives was appointed to examine the credentials of whether Alexander Faribault was entitled to his seat on the Minnesota Territorial House of Representatives. On January 21, 1851, this special committee found that his election was in accordance with the spirit and meaning of the election laws allowing Alexander Faribault to serve the remainder of his term.

His first house in Faribault, the Alexander Faribault House, was built in 1853 and is listed on the National Register of Historic Places. Faribault only lived in the home for a handful of years, building a large brick mansion on the bluffs opposite the Straight River several years later. This second house was later sold to the state of Minnesota to be used for the Minnesota School for the Blind. However, only the 1853 house, the first frame house in Rice County, survives.

The first Catholic Mass in the City of Faribault was held at Alexander Faribault's house in 1848. Alexander contributed the land and a large sum of money for the construction of the first Catholic Church, St. Ann in 1856. Within a year this church burned down and Catholic Masses were once again held at Alexander's house. Alexander made a larger financial contribution to build a fireproof stone church on the same site as St. Ann in 1858. This church was named Immaculate Conception and is still standing at the corner of 3rd Avenue South West and Division Street West in the city of Faribault.

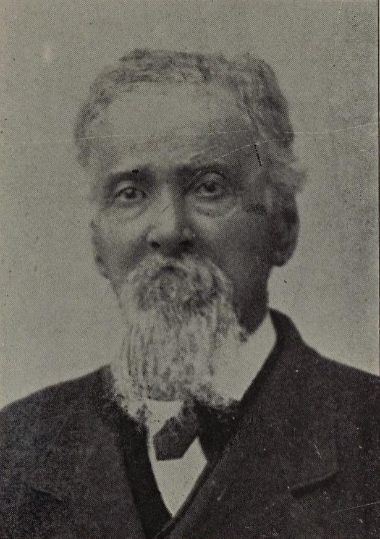
Photograph of Alexander Faribault

More settlement came to Rice County in the mid-1850s. Faribault, along with several other early settlers, filed the plat of the town of Faribault in 1855. Faribault offered inducements to other institutions in Faribault, including James Lloyd Breck and Bishop Henry Whipple, contributing ten acres of land for their schools (which became Seabury Divinity School and Shattuck-St. Marys) as well as money. Faribault was also involved in the founding of the first mills on the Straight River which brought skilled millers to the town, was a trustee of the first school district in the county (the first school had been hosted in his home), helped to set up several of the first public parks in the area, and was the first postmaster.

His son-in-law was William Henry Forbes, who also served in the Minnesota Territorial Legislature. Faribault died in Faribault, Minnesota, after suffering a "paralytic shock" (stroke) the previous month.

== Relationship with the Dakota ==
Faribault accompanied the Dakota delegation to Washington for a treaty in 1837. In 1851, he was a translator for the Treaty of Traverse des Sioux and was at the Treaty of Mendota. He served as a witness before the United States court regarding charges of fraud in "Indian affairs."

During the Dakota War of 1862, there was no violence in the city of Faribault or surrounding areas in Rice County. Historians credit this to Alexander Faribault's just and liberal treatment of the Dakota people as it was in stark contrast to the majority of southern Minnesota.

Alexander Faribault accompanied the 6th Minnesota Infantry Regiment to the Battle of Birch Coulee, the bloodiest battle in the war for American soldiers. During the siege, Alexander Faribault pleaded for peace. Speaking Dakota, Alexander pleaded to Big Eagle, "You do very wrong to fire on us. We did not come out to fight; we only came out to bury the bodies of the white people you killed."

After most Dakota were ordered into exile from their Minnesota homelands in 1863, Faribault sheltered a number of Wahpekute and Mdewakanton people on his farm.

== Legacy ==
A number of memorials, murals and statues are around the city of Faribault to honor Alexander.

In 1958 the Knights of Columbus built a memorial to Alexander at the entrance to Calvary Cemetery with the transcription: "This monument has been dedicated to the memory of Alexander Faribault, early explorer and founder of this city. His life was noble, his virtues were Christian. Race or creed did not color his judgements. He saw in every man the image of God and thereby the possibility of making this a better place in which to live. He was a model for modern citizenship. May the spirit of his life be a benediction for future generations."
