= Cannon River STEM School =

Defunct charter school in Minnesota, U.S.

Coordinates: 44.311143°N 93.264348°W

- Faribault, Minnesota

Information
- School type: Public charter
- Established: 2009
- Closed: June 30, 2025
- Faculty: 13
- Campus type: Residential
- Website: www.cannonriverstemschool.org

Cannon River STEM School (specializing in Science, Technology, Engineering, and Math) was a K–8 charter school in Faribault, Minnesota, United States. It opened in 2009 and closed in 2025.

== History ==
Cannon River STEM School was originally slated to be on the property of Maltby Nature Preserve, between Stanton and Randolph, until the property went into foreclosure. The school looked for other buildings in the Northfield area, until they received an offer for a former Shattuck-Saint Mary's building. Bus lines ran from Northfield and Randolph to the school.

The school repeatedly faced citations for governance failures and contract violations since 2017. In March 2025, the school announced it would be closing on June 30, 2025, citing financial challenges.

== See also ==
- Faribault, Minnesota
- Northfield, Minnesota
- Shattuck-Saint Mary's
- Northfield School of Arts and Technology
