= River Bend Nature Center =

Nature center in the city of Faribault, Minnesota

- Location within Minnesota
- Location: Faribault, Minnesota
- Coordinates: 44°16′31″N 93°14′52″W
- Area: 743 acres (3.01 km^{2})
- Website: www.rbnc.org

River Bend Nature Center is a non-profit day-use nature center in the city of Faribault, Minnesota. It was established in the late 1970s as an educational non-profit. The nature center encompasses 743 acres (3.01 km^{2}) cradling the Straight River. There are 10 miles (16 km) of formal hiking trails with some also available for skiing, snowshoeing, biking, and snowmobiling. The main Interpretive Center houses naturalist staff, displays, Windows on the Wild backyard bird habitat, and the Carlander Nature Library. The Trailside Center is a 3-season programming and maintenance facility. Five peripheral parcels of River Bend are owned by The Nature Conservancy.

== Notable flora and fauna ==
The center contains a variety of habitats including wetlands, forests, and more than 55 acres (220,000 m^{2}) of restored and original prairie. The center contains some specimens of the endangered dwarf trout lily.

== Programming and staff ==
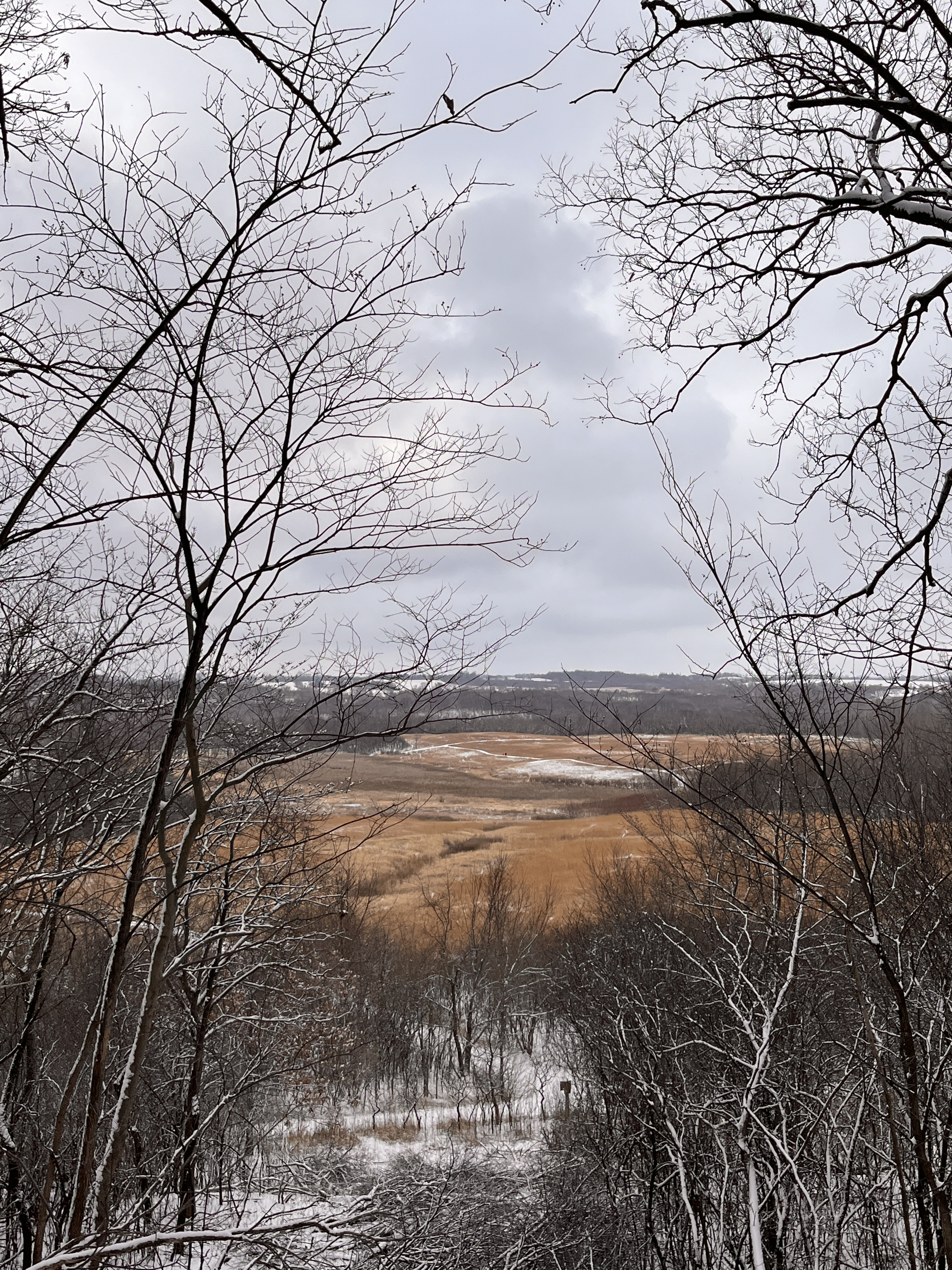
View from North Ridge Overlook

The River Bend Nature Center staff conducts interpretive programs for adults and children throughout the year. Children from public and several charter elementary schools in Rice County visit the center regularly as part of the science curriculum at those schools. In addition, River Bend staff travel to schools and home-schooled students throughout Rice County to provide natural and environmental education in several off-site programs.

== Location ==
River Bend is located just off state highway 60 in the southeast corner of the city of Faribault in central Rice County.
