= USS Faribault =

Cargo ship of the United States Navy

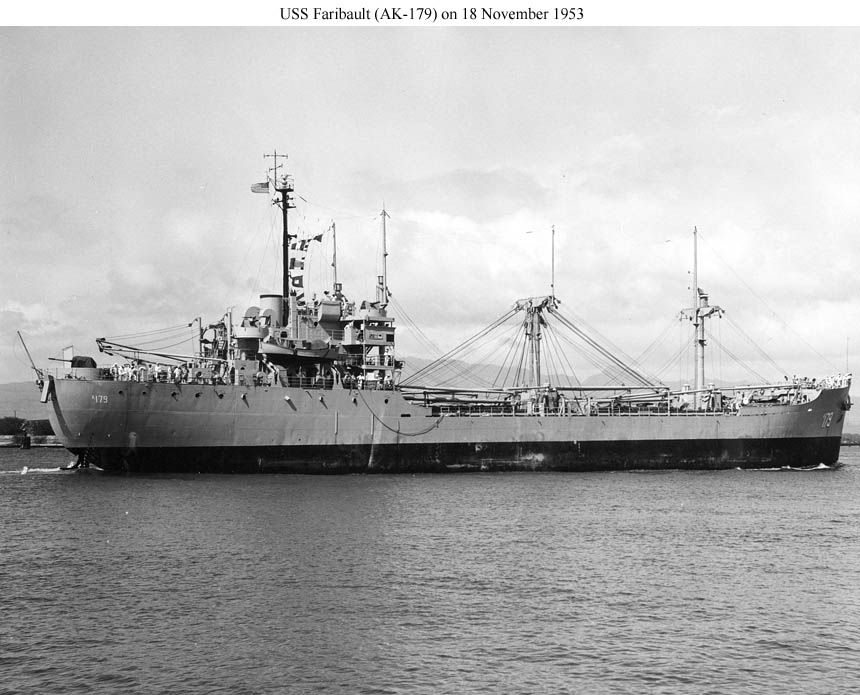
- USS Faribault (AK-179) underway at Pearl Harbor, 18 November 1953.

History

United States
- Name: Faribault
- Namesake: Faribault County, Minnesota
- Ordered: as type (C1-M-AV1) hull, MC hull 2375
- Builder: Kaiser Shipbuilding Co., Richmond, California
- Yard number: 71
- Laid down: 1944
- Launched: 24 February 1945
- Sponsored by: Mrs. L. J. Morand
- Acquired: 20 April 1945
- Commissioned: 20 April 1945
- Decommissioned: 10 July 1946
- Recommissioned: 26 June 1947
- Decommissioned: 20 July 1956
- Stricken: date unknown
- Identification: Hull symbol: AK-179; Code letters: NEKK
- Honors and awards: 2 × battle stars for Korean War service
- Fate: Sold for scrapping, 17 October 1960

General characteristics
- Class & type: Alamosa-class cargo ship
- Type: C1-M-AV1
- Tonnage: 5,032 long tons deadweight (DWT)
- Displacement: 2,382 long tons (2,420 t) (standard); 7,450 long tons (7,570 t) (full load)
- Length: 388 ft 8 in (118.47 m)
- Beam: 50 ft (15 m)
- Draft: 21 ft 1 in (6.43 m)
- Installed power: 1 × Nordberg, TSM 6 diesel engine; 1,750 shp (1,300 kW)
- Propulsion: 1 × propeller
- Speed: 11.5 kn (21.3 km/h; 13.2 mph)
- Capacity: 3,945 t (3,883 long tons) DWT; 9,830 cu ft (278 m^{3}) (refrigerated); 227,730 cu ft (6,449 m^{3}) (non-refrigerated)
- Complement: 15 Officers; 70 Enlisted
- Armament: 1 × 3 in (76 mm)/50 caliber dual purpose gun (DP); 6 × 20 mm (0.8 in) Oerlikon anti-aircraft (AA) cannons

USS Faribault (AK-179) was an Alamosa-class cargo ship acquired by the U.S. Navy during the final months of World War II. Faribault served US military forces in the Pacific Ocean until shortly after the war when she was deactivated. During the Korean War, she was reactivated and served with distinction, having been awarded two battle stars before final decommissioning.

== Construction ==
Faribault was launched 24 February 1945 by Kaiser Cargo, Inc., Richmond, California, under a Maritime Commission contract, MC hull 2375; sponsored by Mrs. L. J. Morand; acquired by the Navy 20 April 1945; and commissioned the same day.

== Service history ==
=== World War II-related service ===
Between 16 June and 1 September 1945, Faribault voyaged from San Francisco, California, to Leyte and Eniwetok with cargo, then sailed again 29 September with cargo for use in the occupation of Japan.

She remained in the western Pacific Ocean, carrying cargo to and from Yokosuka, Guam, Saipan, Okinawa, Luzon, Samar, and Manus Island, until returning to San Francisco 23 April 1946. Faribault was decommissioned at Seattle, Washington, 10 July 1946, and returned to the US Maritime Commission the following day.

=== Korean War reactivation ===
Reacquired 16 May 1947, Faribault was recommissioned 26 June 1947 at Bremerton, Washington, and assigned to duty in the Service Force, Pacific Fleet, based on Pearl Harbor, Hawaii.

She ranged among the islands of the Hawaiian, Marshall, Caroline, and Philippine groups, as well as other isolated islands such as Johnston Island. Between 7 November 1952 and 22 July 1953, she carried cargo from Pearl Harbor to Japan and Korea for support of the troops in Korea, then returned to duty in the Central Pacific.

Faribault served in the Far East once more between 11 August 1954 and 3 April 1955, and during September, October, and November 1954, lay at Tourane and Haiphong, Indochina, acting as fleet issue ship to the force carrying out Operation Passage to Freedom, the evacuation of civilian refugees from Communist-held North Vietnam. From April 1955 through the remainder of the year, she carried cargo from Pearl Harbor to Midway Islands and the Marshall Islands.

=== Final decommissioning ===
On 13 April 1956 she arrived at San Diego, California, where she was placed out of commission in reserve 20 July 1956, in the San Diego Group of the Pacific Reserve Fleet.

Ultimately, following the rejection of two bids, both for a scrap sale in the United States, the Learner Company won the bid opened on 21 September 1960, to scrap the vessel in Japan. The Maritime Administration awarded the contract on 17 October 1960. The vessel was removed from government custody on 14 December 1960.CITEREFMARAD

== Honors and awards ==
Faribault received two battle stars for Korean War service.

== Notes ==
Citations

== Bibliography ==
Online resources

- "Faribault (AK-179)". Dictionary of American Naval Fighting Ships. Naval History and Heritage Command. 22 March 2016. This article incorporates text from this source, which is in the public domain.
- "C1 Cargo Ships". www.ShipbuildingHistory.com. 28 August 2009.
- "USS Faribault (AK-179))". NavSource. 8 November 2013.
- "Faribault (AK-179)". United States Department of Transportation. Archived from the original on March 14, 2016.
