= Ralph H. Illsley =

American politician (1896–1952)

Ralph H. Illsley (June 11, 1896 – October 15, 1952) was an American farmer and politician.

Illsley was born in Rice County, Minnesota and lived with his wife and family in Dundas, Minnesota and was a farmer. Illsley served in the United States Army during World War I. Illsley served on the Dundas School Board and was the board treasurer. Illsley served in the Minnesota House of Representatives from 1945 until his death in 1952. He was killed in an automobile accident on Minnesota State Highway 3 in Rosemount, Dakota County, Minnesota while driving to his home from the Minnesota State Capitol.
