= Jean-Baptiste Faribault =

French Canadian trader

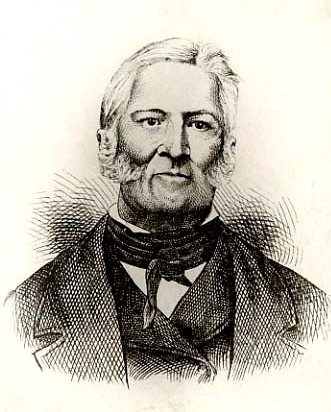
- Faribault circa 1860
- Born: October 19, 1775; Berthier, Quebec, Canada
- Died: August 20, 1860 (aged 84); Faribault, Minnesota, USA
- Resting place: Calvary Cemetery, Faribault, MN
- Employer: North West Fur Company American Fur Company
- Spouse: Pelagie Faribault (married 1805)
- Children: 8

Jean-Baptiste Faribault (October 19, 1775 – August 20, 1860) was a trader with the North West Company and the American Fur Company who traded with the Dakota and other indigenous groups, and an early settler in Minnesota.

== Early life ==
His father, Barthélemy Faribault, a lawyer of Paris, France, settled in Canada towards the middle of the 18th century and served as military secretary to the French army in Canada, notably French General Louis-Joseph Montcalm. After the occupation of the country by the English, he retired to private life in Berthier and he held the office of notary public.

Faribault was born in Berthier, Lower Canada, and received a good school education. He spent several years in mercantile employment in Quebec before entering the fur trade, most probably in the employ of Parker, Gerrard, and Ogilvy.

== Fur trade ==
In May 1798, he went with others to the island of Michilimackinac or Mackinac, one of the depots of Parker, Gerrard, and Ogilvy. For over ten years, he traded with the Pottowatomic at Kankakee, with the Dakota or the Sioux at Redwood on the Des Moines river, and at Little Rapids on the Minnesota River just upstream of present-day Carver, Minnesota, on behalf of the North West Fur Company.

During his residence at Little Rapids, in 1805, Faribault married Elizabeth Pelagie Ainse, daughter of Joseph-Louis Ainse, a British superintendent at Mackinac, and a Dakota woman. Pelagie had previously been married and was suddenly widowed soon before she married Faribault. Together, they had eight children.

In 1809, Faribault settled in the small village of Prairie du Chien, Wisconsin, and commenced trading, on his own account, with the Winnebago, Fox, and Dakota. In addition to that, he conducted an exchange of lead with Julien Dubuque, at the point now occupied by the city of that name.

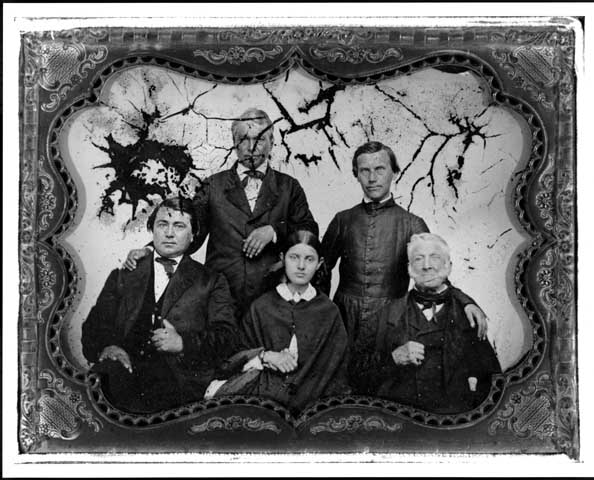
Ambrotype (c. 1850) of "George and Euphrasine Faribault's wedding portrait. Left to right, top: Alexander Faribault, Fr. Augustin Ravoux. Left to right, bottom: George Faribult, Euphrasine St. Antoine Faribault, Jean-Baptiste Faribault."

During the War of 1812, Faribault refused to enlist in the British army, and suffered imprisonment and the loss of all his goods in consequence. After the conclusion of the war, in 1815, he became a citizen of the United States, and recommenced his trade at Prairie du Chien with the American Fur Company.

== Later life ==
In 1819, he moved to Pike Island in the Mississippi River, which his wife received ownership of under an 1820 treaty. He attempted to farm on Pike Island, but repeatedly lost his work to flooding. In 1826, he moved to St. Peter (Mendota, Minnesota), opposite the military post of Fort Snelling. Faribault became well-established in Mendota and built a stone house in 1839. Attached to the Roman Catholic faith of his childhood, he presented a house for a chapel to Lucien Galtier, the first resident missionary in Minnesota.

In May 1833, Faribault purchased an enslaved woman, despite the fact that slavery had been outlawed by the Missouri Compromise in 1820. Although slavery was outlawed, it was not uncommon at and near Fort Snelling prior to the 1850s.

Sometime after the death of his wife in 1847, Faribault moved to live with his children in the town of Faribault, Minnesota, named for his eldest son, Alexander Faribault. Faribault County in southern Minnesota was named after Jean-Baptiste.

He died at Faribault, Minnesota, on August 20, 1860, at the age of 84.

== Faribault house in Mendota ==
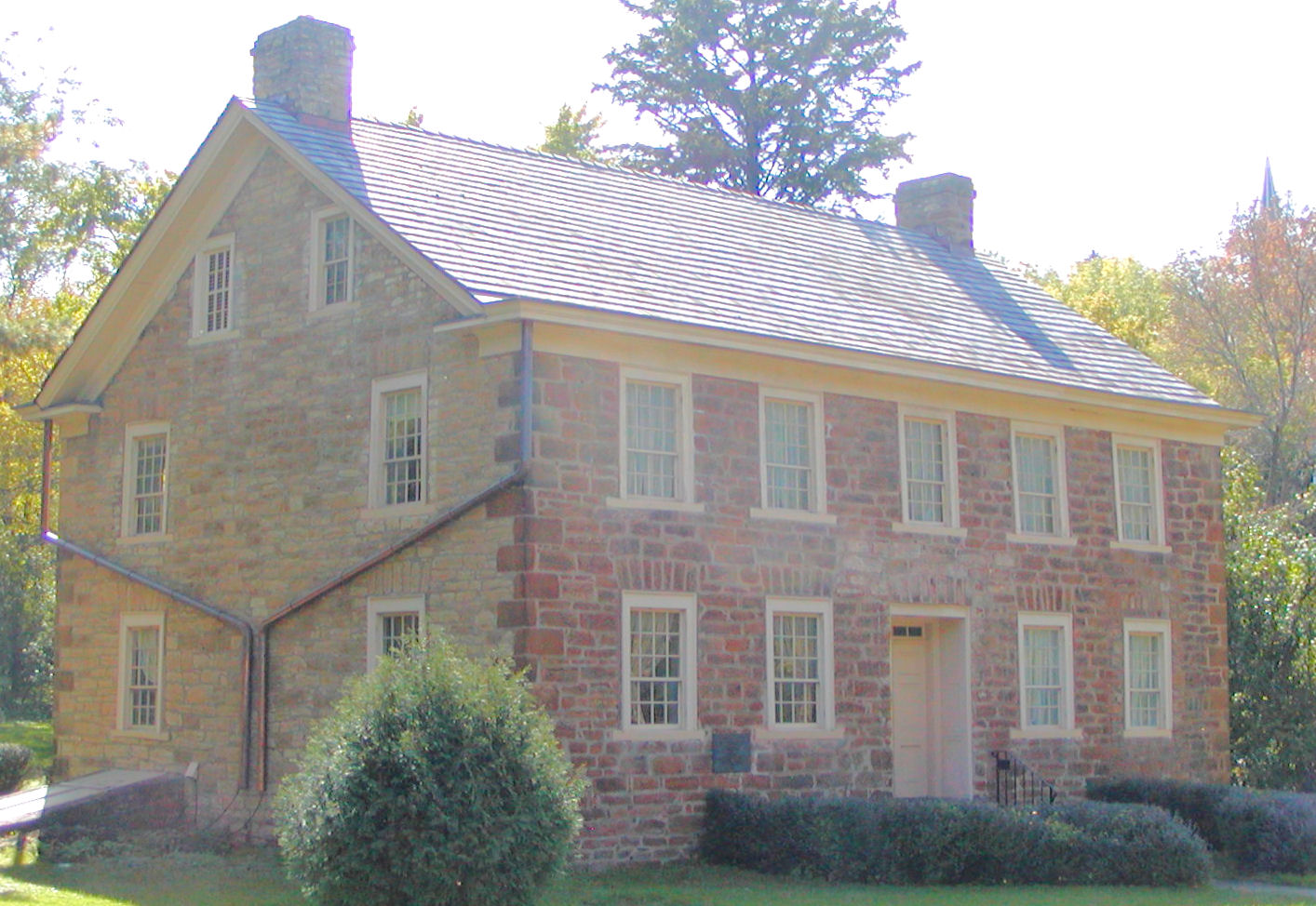
His home in Mendota, Minnesota

The Faribault house was built in 1839 out of Platteville Limestone and sandstone. Faribault wished for the house "to be furnished in the same manner as the dwelling house built…for H. H. Sibley." It cost $5,000 and was completed in June 1840.

After Jean-Baptiste Faribault moved away, the house was used as an inn and later as a storage warehouse. Restoration began in the 1930s by the Minnesota Highway Commission as part of a Civil Works Administration project, and was then donated to the Daughters of the American Revolution. The house first opened to the public in 1937.

The Jean-Baptiste Faribault House is part of the Mendota Historic District, which is listed on the National Register of Historic Places. The house is currently part of Sibley Historic Site, operated by the Minnesota Historical Society.
