= Minnesota State Academy for the Blind =

Coordinates: 44.2866304°N 93.2602154°W

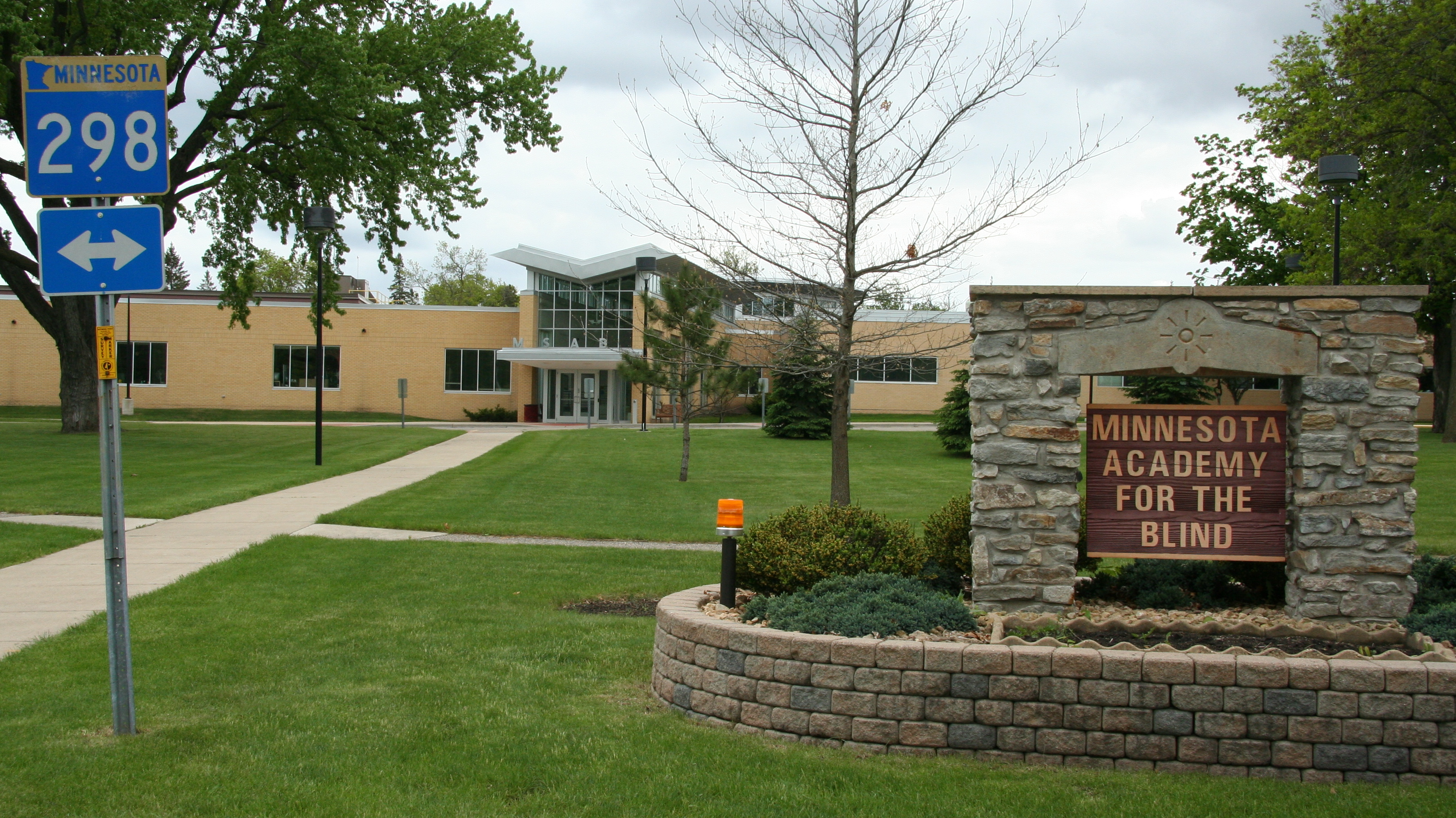
- Minnesota Academy for the Blind main entrance on State Highway 298

Location
- 400 6th Ave SE; Faribault, Minnesota; Faribault, Rice, Minnesota 55021; United States

Information
- Type: Public
- Established: 1866
- School district: 160
- Superintendent: Terry Wilding
- Director: John Davis
- Faculty: 15
- Grades: K - 12+
- Age range: Birth to 22
- Enrollment: 65
- Colors: Maroon and Gold
- Athletics: Goalball, Wrestling, Swimming, Track and Field.
- Newspaper: Chronicles
- Website: Minnesota State Academy for the Blind Website

Minnesota State Academy for the Blind (MSAB) (formerly known as the Braille and Sight Saving School) is a state-operated public school located in Faribault, Minnesota, serving students who are blind, visually impaired, or deaf-blind learners from birth to age 22. Established by the Minnesota Legislature in 1866, MSAB provides specialized educational services, residential programming, and statewide outreach to support students, families educators, and school districts throughout Minnesota.

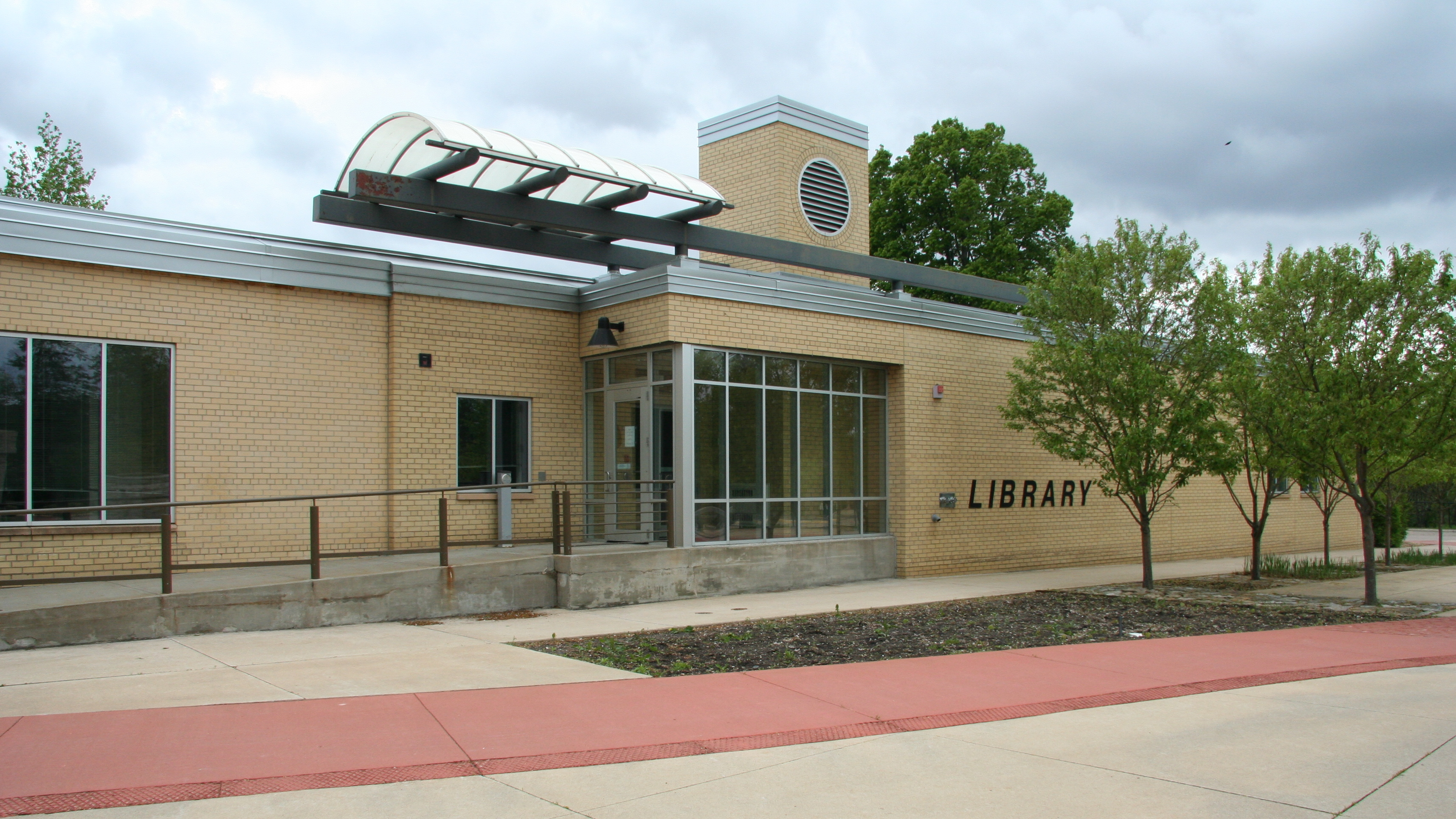
Building formerly occupied by the Minnesota Braille and Talking Book Library.

MSAB offers individualized instruction aligned with each student's Individualized Education Program, emphasizing Braille literacy, assistive technology, orientation and mobility, the Expanded Core Curriculum, transition planning and independent living skills. Students also participate in athletics, extracurricular activities, career development, and residential life programs designed to prepare them for postsecondary education, employment, and independent adulthood.

== Campus ==
The MSAB campus spans approximately 21 acres and includes academic buildings, residential facilities, recreation areas, and specialized learning environments. The school also provides statewide outreach services, including professional development, consultation, educational resources, and short-course programming for students and educators across Minnesota.

== History ==
=== Overview ===
The Minnesota State Academy for the Blind was established by the Minnesota Legislature in 1866, three years after the opening of the Minnesota State Academy for the Deaf. Originally organized as part of the Minnesota Institute for the Education of the Deaf and Dumb and the Blind, the school initially operated in temporary facilities before moving into its first permanent building in 1874.

James J. Dow became principal of the School for the Blind in 1875 and later served as superintendent from 1879 until 1920. During his tenure, the school expanded both academically and physically, introducing vocational education alongside traditional academic instruction while overseeing significant campus growth. Dow Hall, completed in 1883 and later named in his honor, became the academy's central academic and residential building for many decades.

During the twentieth century, the academy expanded and modernized its educational programs and campus facilities in response to changing educational practices and the evolving needs of students who were blind or visually impaired. As newer facilities were constructed, historic buildings such as the Blind Department Building eventually became obsolete and were demolished because of age and structural limitations.

Today, the Minnesota State Academy for the Blind is Minnesota's only state-operated school specializing in the education of students who are Blind, Visually Impaired, or DeafBlind. The academy provides individualized educational programming, residential services, transition programs, and statewide outreach that support students from early childhood though young adulthood.

== See also ==
- Minnesota State Academies
- Blind Department Building and Dow Hall, State School for the Blind
