= Shattuck-Saint Mary's School =

Private secondary school school in Faribault, Minnesota, US

Location
- 1000 Shumway Ave; Faribault, Minnesota 55021; United States

Information
- Other name: Shattuck-St. Mary's
- Type: Private, day and boarding
- Religious affiliation: Episcopal
- Established: 1858
- Grades: 6–12
- Colors: Maroon, Black, and White
- Athletics conference: MSHSL
- Mascot: Sabres
- Newspaper: The Spectator
- Website: www.s-sm.org

- Shattuck Historic District
- U.S. National Register of Historic Places
- U.S. Historic district
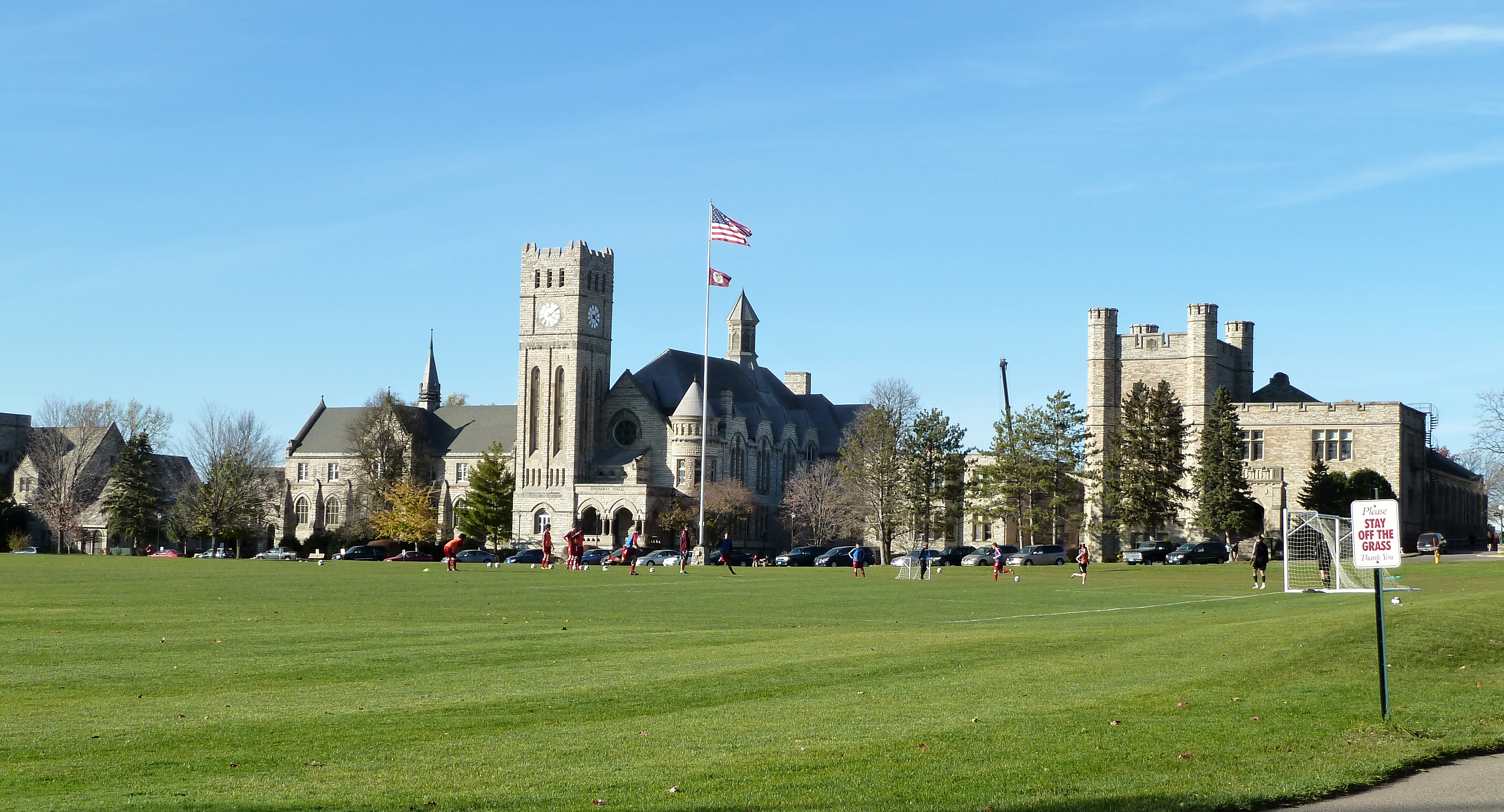
- Shattuck Historic District from the southeast
- Location: Shumway Ave
- Area: 35 acres (14 ha)
- Built: 1869–mid-1950s
- Architectural style: Gothic Revival
- MPS: Rice County MRA
- NRHP reference No.: 82003018
- Added to NRHP: April 6, 1982

- Shumway Hall and Morgan Refectory--Shattuck School
- U.S. National Register of Historic Places
- U.S. Historic district – Contributing property
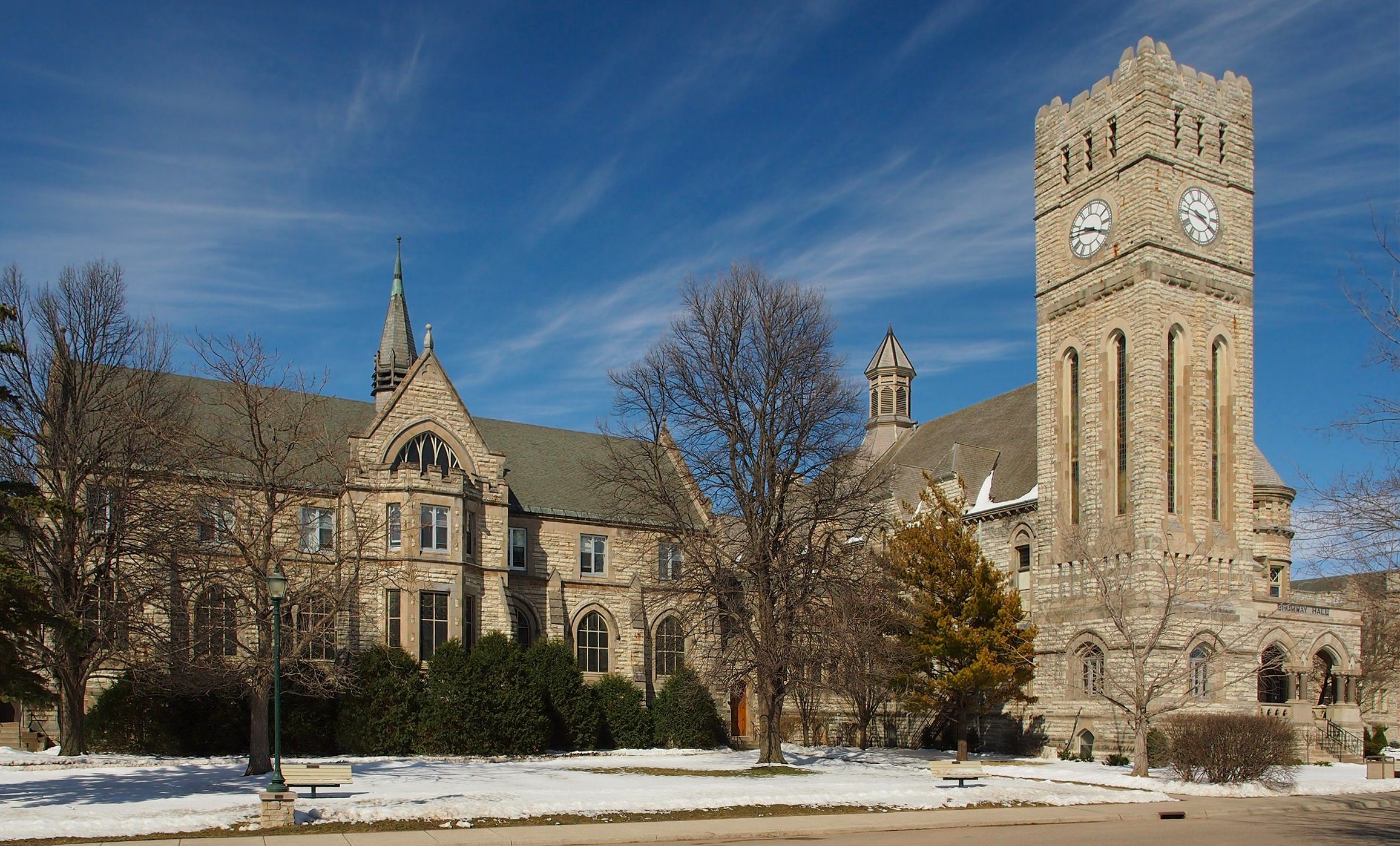
- Morgan Refectory (left) and Shumway Hall (right)
- Location: Off Shumway Ave.
- Coordinates: 44°18′9″N 93°15′36″W
- Built: 1887 (Shumway Hall), 1888 (Morgan Refectory)
- Architects: Wilcox & Johnston
- Architectural style: Gothic/Romanesque Revival
- NRHP reference No.: 75001023
- Added to NRHP: April 4, 1975

Shattuck-Saint Mary's School (SSM; branded as Shattuck-St. Mary's) is a private, coeducational, Episcopal-affiliated boarding school in the city of Faribault in Rice County, Minnesota.

== History ==
Established in 1858 as an Episcopal mission school and seminary, within a decade the school grew to include Shattuck Military Academy, St. Mary's Hall for girls and later in 1901 St. James School for younger boys. In 1974, the three schools dropped all military programs and combined as Shattuck-St. Mary's. The school began developing its ice hockey program, for which it is now known, in the early 90s.

In 1871, a St. Mary's biology instructor discovered a federal- and state-listed endangered species, the dwarf trout lily, on the school's campus.

Cannon River STEM School, a K-8 charter school, was a tenant on the St. James campus from 2009 until its closure in 2025.

SSM opened an expansion school at the Beijing Bayi School in Beijing, China in 2013, but ended the partnership in 2016 over disagreements regarding control and funding. Another campus was planned to open in Suzhou in 2017.

In 2025, SSM opened its first dedicated international campus in Haiphong, Vietnam.

== Faculty and sex abuse of minors ==
In 2012, drama teacher Lynn Seibel was arrested and pleaded guilty to several counts of sexual abuse and one count of using minors in a sexual performance; he was sentenced to prison. Court filings and depositions from a subsequent lawsuit against the school revealed that administrators and attorneys had known of Seibel's criminal behavior since 2003, but had not contacted authorities, even when Seibel went on to teach at other schools.

== Athletics recognition ==
SSM has won 36 USA Hockey national championships among its eight hockey teams:

- Boys Prep (U-17/U-18): 1999, 2001, 2003, 2005, 2007, 2008, 2011, 2012, 2014, 2023, 2024.
- Girls Prep (U-19): 2005, 2006, 2007, 2009, 2011, 2016, 2017, 2018, 2023, 2024.
- Boys High School: 2022, 2023, 2024
- Girls High School: 2023
- Boys U-16: 2015, 2016.
- Girls U-16: 2010, 2013, 2014, 2015, 2016, 2024.
- Boys U-14: 2014, 2016, 2021

In the U.S. Soccer Development Academy league, in the 2012–13 season, SSM's Boys U17/U18 team placed first in its division, and later became national runners-up, losing to the New York Red Bulls in overtime. In the 2013–14 season, the team placed second in its division.

== Alumni ==
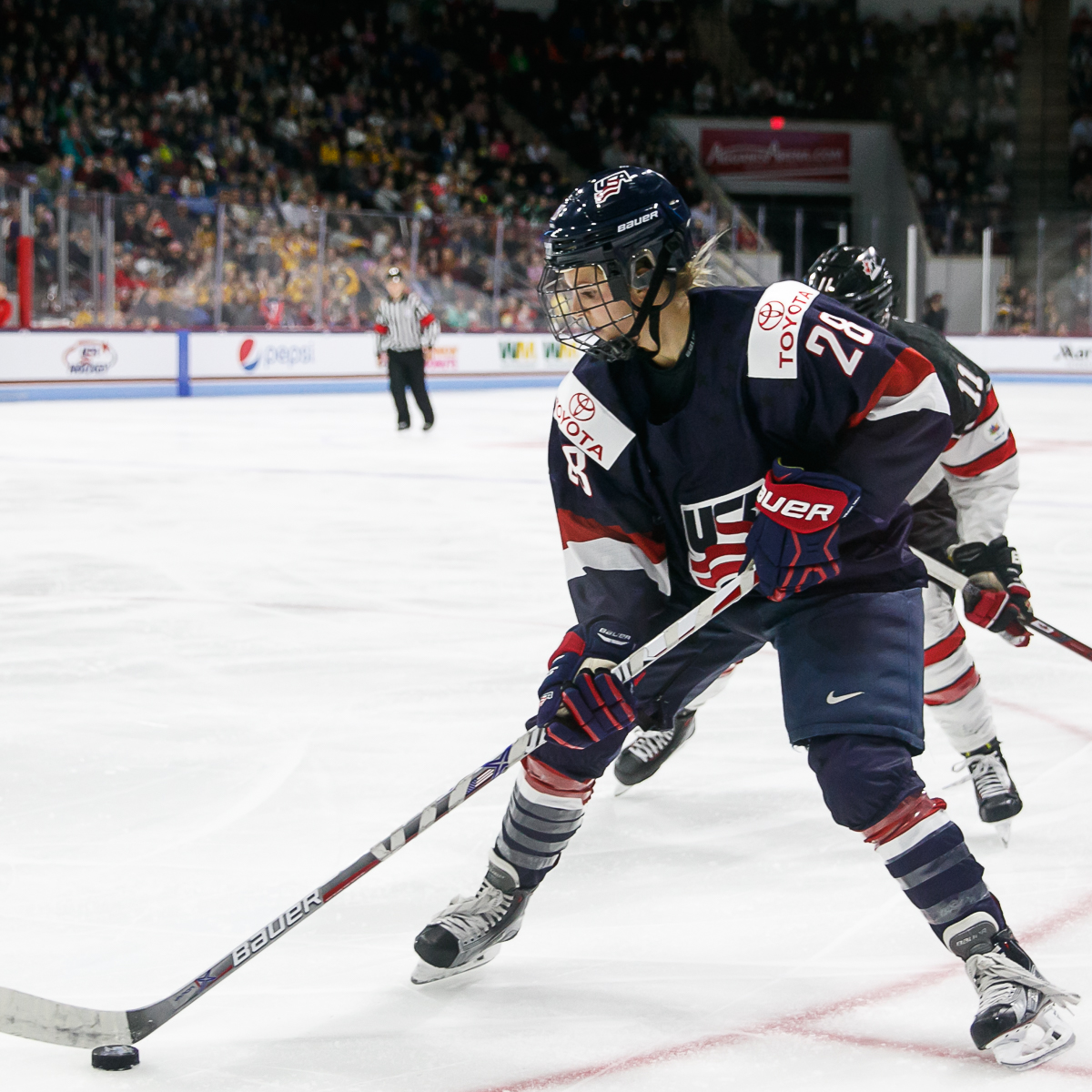
Amanda Kessel

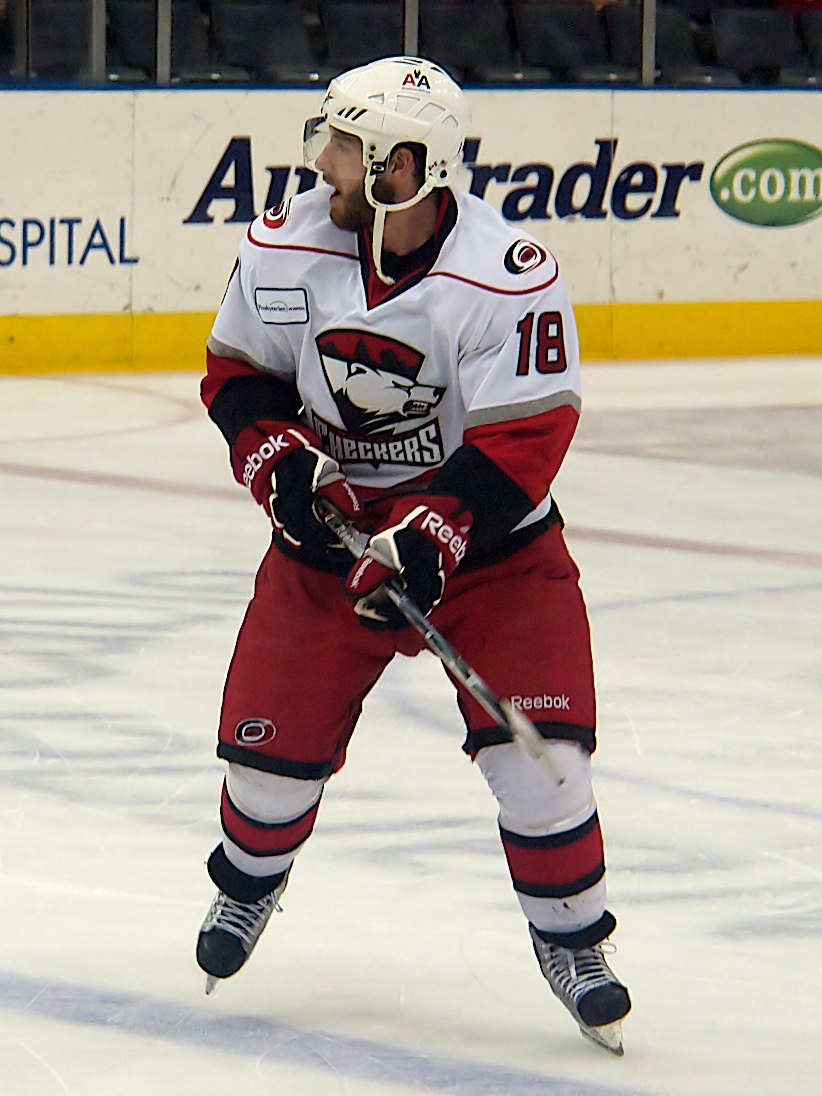
Jacob Micflikier

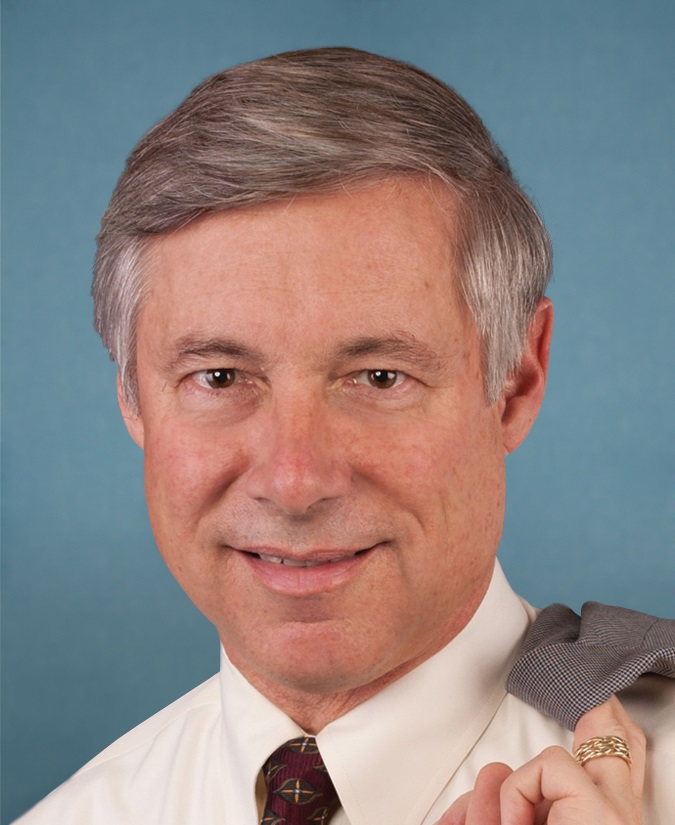
Fred Upton

=== Arts and theater ===
- Marlon Brando, class of 1944, expelled prior to graduation
- Ted Hartley, fighter pilot, businessman, actor, entrepreneur
- Jimmy Chin, class of 1992, athlete and photographer, expelled
- William Blake Herron, author, class of 1981
- Harry N. MacLean, class of 1960, Edgar Award winning true crime author
- Wendy Shon (손승완, RR: Shon Seung-wan), member of K-pop girl group, Red Velvet, attended 2007–2010
- Townes Van Zandt, singer-songwriter, class of 1962

=== Ice hockey ===
- Sidney Crosby, Pittsburgh Penguins captain drafted first overall in 2005, attended 2002–2003.
- Teddy Bleuger, Vancouver Canucks forward, class of 2012.
- Macklin Celebrini, San Jose Sharks captain drafted first overall in 2024, attended 2020–2022.
- Ty Conklin, Detroit Red Wings, University of New Hampshire, class of 1994
- Aerin Frankel, Boston Fleet goaltender, class of 2017.
- Conor Garland, Columbus Blue Jackets forward.
- Erik Haula, NHL player, attended 2008-09.
- Lee Jin-gyu, 2018 Winter Olympics, Team Korea player, class of 2019
- Clayton Keller, Utah Mammoth forward.
- Amanda Kessel, former ice hockey player, Olympic gold medalist, assistant GM of the Wilkes-Barre/Scranton Penguins.
- Jocelyne Lamoureux, hockey Gold Medalist
- Abbey Levy, San Jose Sea Lions goaltender.
- Tynan Lawrence, top prospect eligible for the 2026 NHL entry draft.
- Ryan Lindgren, Seattle Kraken defenseman.
- Nathan MacKinnon, Colorado Avalanche alternate captain drafted first overall in 2013.
- Ryan Malone, formerly of the Tampa Bay Lightning, St. Cloud State, class of 1999.
- Jacob Micflikier, ice hockey player.
- Kyle Okposo, Florida Panthers, University of Minnesota Golden Gophers hockey, class of 2006.
- Jordan Parise, EC KAC, University of North Dakota, class of 2001.
- Zach Parise, University of North Dakota hockey, Minnesota Wild forward, class of 2002.
- Morgan Stickney, first female American player to be selected in a Canadian Hockey League draft, class of 2026
- Mackie Samoskevich, Florida Panthers forward.
- Jonathan Toews, Winnipeg Jets forward, formerly of the Chicago Blackhawks and the University of North Dakota, class of 2005.
- Chris Porter, former NHL defenseman.
- Blayre Turnbull, Toronto Sceptres forward and captain.
- Maureen Murphy, Vegas Vanguards forward, formerly of the Montreal Victoire, class of 2017.
- Cam York, Philadelphia Flyers defenseman.

=== Military and politics ===
- Esther Agbaje, member of the Minnesota House of Representatives, class of 2003.
- William Benton, former U.S. senator and former chairman of the board and publisher of the Encyclopædia Britannica, class of 1917.
- Todd Blodgett, member of White House staff and worked for the FBI.
- Deming Bronson, Medal of Honor recipient, class of 1911.
- Daniel W. Hand, U.S. Army brigadier general
- Hubert H. "Skip" Humphrey, III, former attorney general and state senator for Minnesota, son of former Vice President Hubert Humphrey, class of 1961.
- James L. Jones Sr., early pioneer of amphibious reconnaissance, class of 1930.
- John F. Malony, capitalist, lawyer, and politician
- Craig R. McKinley, four-star general.
- Richard Moe, former Chief of Staff to the Vice President of the United States.
- Frederick Stephen Upton, Member of the U.S. House of Representatives.
- Russell W. Volckmann, brigadier general, U.S. Army; guerrilla leader, Philippine resistance; founder, U.S. Army Special Forces; class of 1930.

=== Other ===
- David Abidor, soccer player
- Trevor Amann, soccer player
- Teal Bunbury, soccer player, class of 2008
- Frederick Mears, civil and railroad engineer.
- Frank Rosebrook Millspaugh, Bishop of Kansas, class of 1870
- Brent Musburger, sportscaster, class of 1957
- Kim Seung-youn, chairman of Hanwha Group.
- Thomas Siebel, founder, chairman, and chief executive officer of Siebel Systems, class of 1971
- Bud Wilkinson, football coach, University of Oklahoma; class of 1933

=== Other notable associations ===
- Clifford C. Furnas athlete, educator, public servant
- Andy Murray, former head coach of the ice hockey team
- Craig Norwich former head coach of the ice hockey team
