= Faribault, Minnesota =

City in Minnesota, United States

Faribault
- City
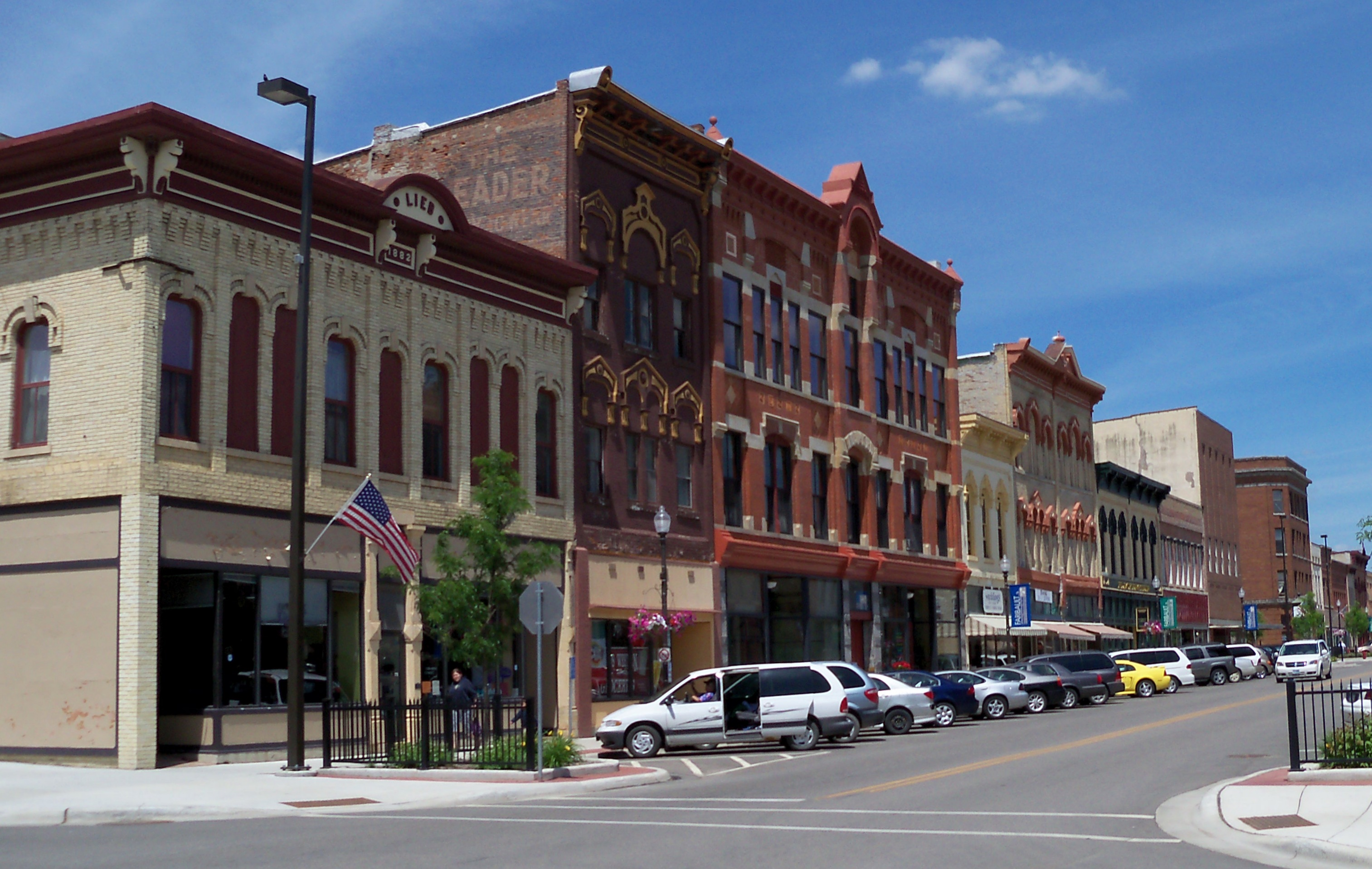
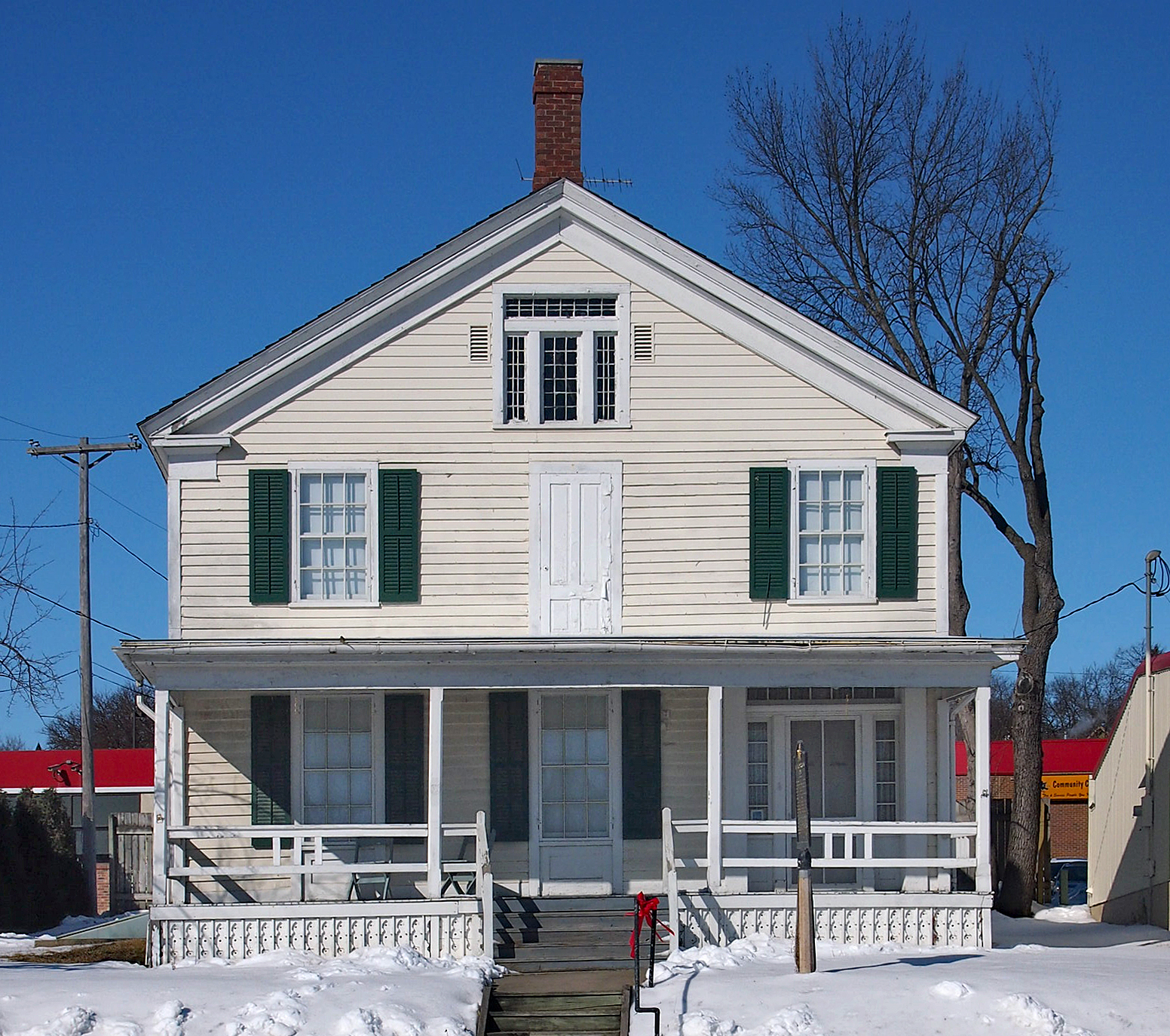
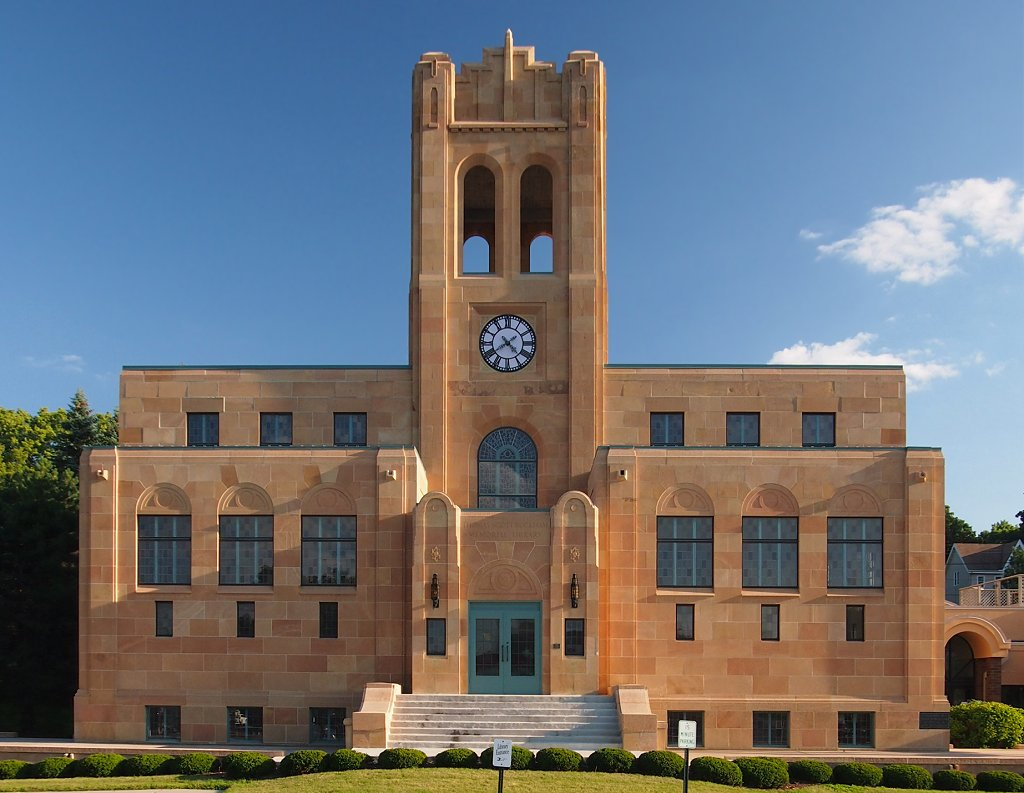
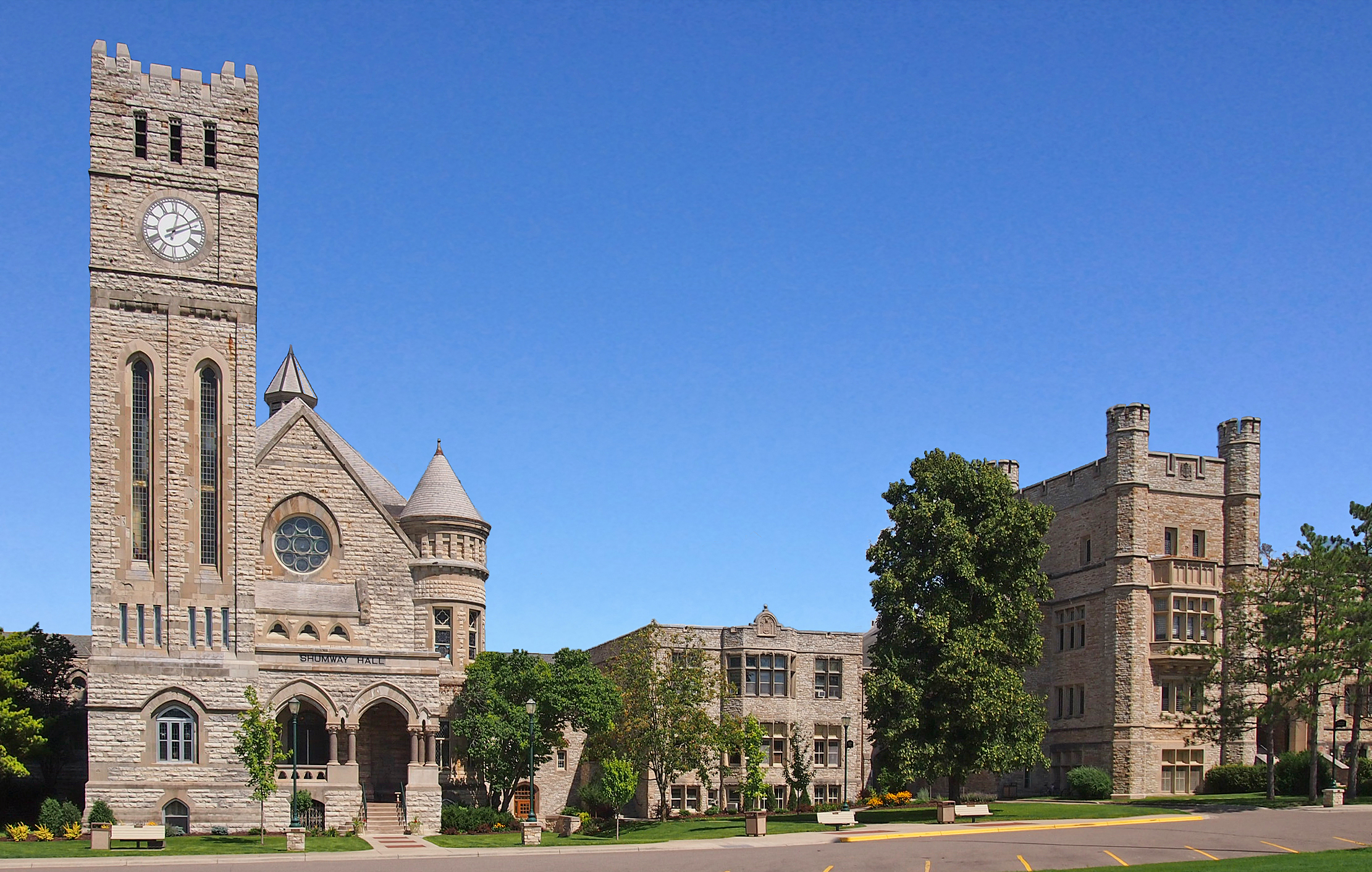
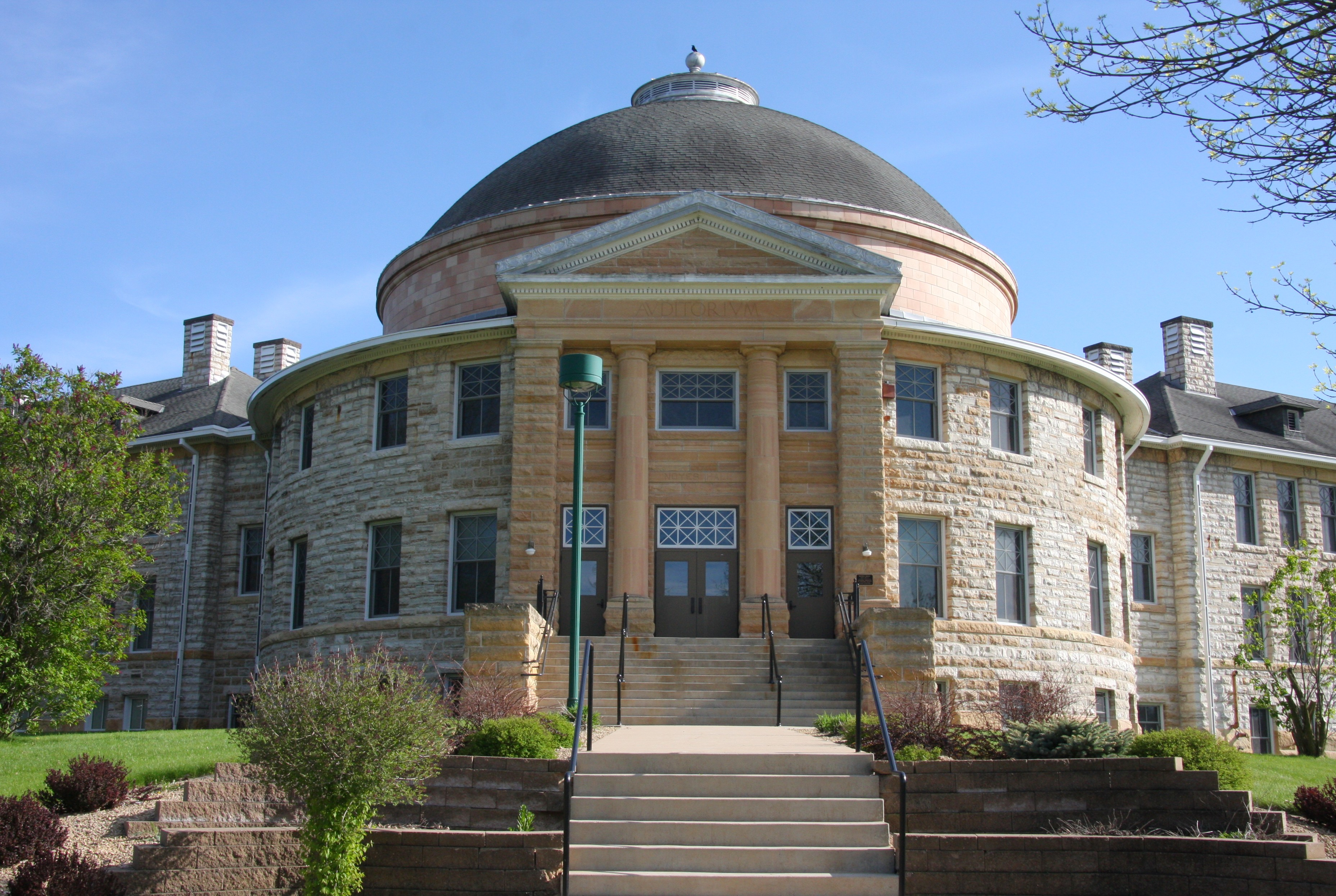
- Downtown Faribault Alexander Faribault House Buckham Memorial Library Shattuck Historic District Noyes Hall, MSAD

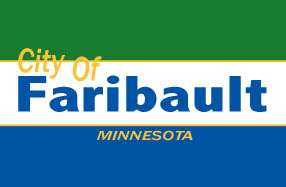
- Flag Logo
- Nicknames: "Faribo", "Athens of the West"
- Motto(s): "Small Town Pride, Big City Opportunities"
- Location of the city of Faribault within Rice County in the state of Minnesota
- Coordinates: 44°17′40″N 93°15′45″W
- Country: United States
- State: Minnesota
- County: Rice
- Founded: February 1855
- Incorporated: February 29, 1872

Government
  - Mayor: Thomas Spooner

Area
  - Total: 15.78 sq mi (40.86 km^{2})
  - Land: 15.50 sq mi (40.15 km^{2})
  - Water: 0.27 sq mi (0.71 km^{2})
- Elevation: 981 ft (299 m)

Population (2020)
  - Total: 24,453
  - Estimate (2022): 24,518
  - Density: 1,577.4/sq mi (609.03/km^{2})
- Time zone: UTC-6 (Central (CST))
  - Summer (DST): UTC-5 (CDT)
- ZIP code: 55021
- Area code: 507
- FIPS code: 27-20546
- GNIS feature ID: 2394742
- Sales tax: 7.375%
- Website: ci.faribault.mn.us

Faribault (/ˈfɛərboʊ/ FAIR-boh) is a city in and the county seat of Rice County, Minnesota, United States. The population was 24,453 at the 2020 census. Faribault is about 50 miles (80 km) south of Minneapolis–Saint Paul.

Interstate 35 and Minnesota State Highways 3, 21, and 60 are the principal highways serving the city. Faribault is at the confluence of the Cannon and Straight Rivers. It is home to the Minnesota State Academy for the Deaf and the Minnesota State Academy for the Blind.

== History ==
Faribault is regarded as one of Minnesota's most historic communities, with settlement and commercial activity predating Minnesota's establishment as a U.S. Territory. Until 1745, the area was primarily occupied by the Wahpekute band of Dakotah. Shortly thereafter, the tribe was driven south after several clashes with the Ojibwe over territory.

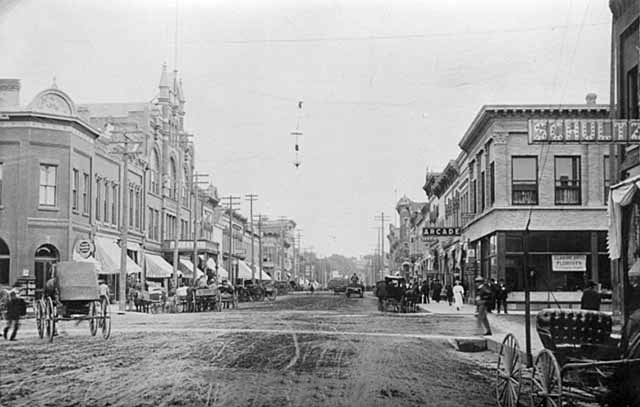
Main Street, circa 1898

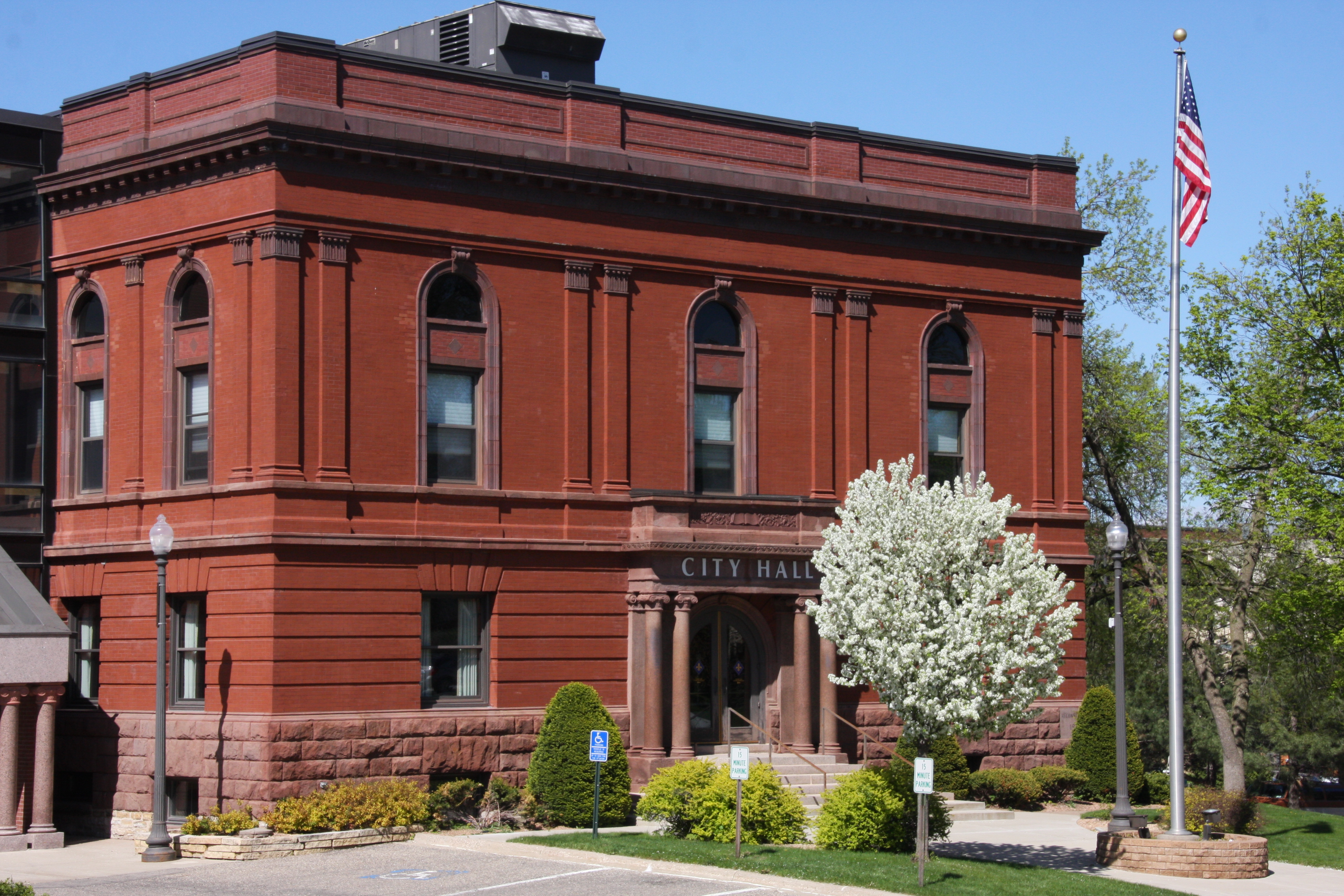
Faribault City Hall

The city's namesake, Alexander Faribault, was the son of Jean-Baptiste Faribault, a French-Canadian fur trader, and Elizabeth Pelagie Kinzie Haines, a Dakotah woman. He is credited with fueling most of the early settlement in the area, beginning in 1826, when he established a fur trading post on the banks of the Cannon River. By 1834, the trading post had grown in popularity and was moved to the Straight River, one mile (1.6 km) upstream of its junction with the Cannon River, the site of modern-day Faribault. The young Alexander Faribault used his knowledge of Dakota language and culture to improve relations with the displaced Wahpekute and even helped the tribe resettle in the area. This relationship was instrumental in ensuring the trading post's success and allowing safe travel to the area for settlers. The Dakota in the area called this soon-to-be town "Adek" for Alex (Alexander Faribault).

Another source maintains the city is named for Jean-Baptiste Faribault.

The Alexander Faribault House was built in 1853 by Alexander Faribault at a cost of $4,000, equal to $154,800 today. It is considered the area's oldest frame structure, and stands in its original location near the southern edge of Faribault's downtown district.

The years following the construction of this first building brought unprecedented growth, development, and economic prosperity to the settlement. Spurred by the completion of the area's first steam-powered sawmill in early 1854, the next year took Faribault from a sleepy settlement of 20 buildings to a bustling town with more than 250. Historians attribute Faribault's growth during this period to a number of important milestones in 1855 and 1856, including the creation of roads connecting to other settlements and trading posts in Iowa and Minnesota Territory, the availability of mail service, and the construction of schools and churches.

The City of Faribault was platted in 1855 and granted a home-rule charter in 1872.

== Geography ==
According to the United States Census Bureau, the city has an area of 15.67 square miles (40.59 km^{2}); 15.32 square miles (39.68 km^{2}) is land and 0.35 square miles (0.91 km^{2}) is water. The confluence of the Straight River and the Cannon River is within the city limits. Sakatah Lake State Park and Nerstrand-Big Woods State Park are nearby.

Interstate Highway 35 runs along the city's western edge. The city is served by two full interchanges and one partial interchange. Before I-35's completion, traffic was routed through town, generating significant sales revenue for retailers that had a major highway running past their doors. Around 1975, the last portions of I-35 were completed, and through traffic started to bypass Faribault. On that same corridor through town, the White Sands Swimming Pool ("Minnesota's Largest Outdoor Swimming Pool") operated from 1964 to 1977. This swimming area is now the White Sands Dog Park, as well as the trailhead of the Sakatah Singing Hills State Trail, which runs to Mankato. The Mill Towns Trail is planned to run to Northfield. The site includes parking, restrooms, and a shelter.

=== Climate ===
Climate data for Faribault, Minnesota, 1991–2020 normals, extremes 1895–2011
Month	Jan	Feb	Mar	Apr	May	Jun	Jul	Aug	Sep	Oct	Nov	Dec	Year
Record high °F (°C)	63 (17)	65 (18)	81 (27)	93 (34)	108 (42)	106 (41)	110 (43)	105 (41)	102 (39)	92 (33)	79 (26)	69 (21)	110 (43)
Mean maximum °F (°C)	42.8 (6.0)	47.7 (8.7)	65.8 (18.8)	79.9 (26.6)	87.4 (30.8)	92.3 (33.5)	93.7 (34.3)	91.7 (33.2)	87.4 (30.8)	79.9 (26.6)	63.9 (17.7)	46.1 (7.8)	95.7 (35.4)
Mean daily maximum °F (°C)	23.2 (−4.9)	28.0 (−2.2)	40.4 (4.7)	55.5 (13.1)	68.2 (20.1)	78.4 (25.8)	82.0 (27.8)	79.9 (26.6)	72.7 (22.6)	58.9 (14.9)	42.4 (5.8)	28.9 (−1.7)	54.9 (12.7)
Daily mean °F (°C)	14.0 (−10.0)	18.0 (−7.8)	30.4 (−0.9)	44.2 (6.8)	56.7 (13.7)	67.8 (19.9)	71.3 (21.8)	68.9 (20.5)	61.2 (16.2)	47.3 (8.5)	33.1 (0.6)	20.7 (−6.3)	44.5 (6.9)
Mean daily minimum °F (°C)	4.8 (−15.1)	7.9 (−13.4)	20.4 (−6.4)	32.9 (0.5)	45.2 (7.3)	57.2 (14.0)	60.6 (15.9)	57.9 (14.4)	49.7 (9.8)	35.7 (2.1)	23.8 (−4.6)	12.6 (−10.8)	34.1 (1.1)
Mean minimum °F (°C)	−18.4 (−28.0)	−14.8 (−26.0)	−1.1 (−18.4)	17.7 (−7.9)	30.3 (−0.9)	41.5 (5.3)	48.9 (9.4)	45.9 (7.7)	33.2 (0.7)	21.7 (−5.7)	6.3 (−14.3)	−12.2 (−24.6)	−23.0 (−30.6)
Record low °F (°C)	−40 (−40)	−36 (−38)	−30 (−34)	0 (−18)	16 (−9)	33 (1)	36 (2)	33 (1)	23 (−5)	4 (−16)	−15 (−26)	−36 (−38)	−40 (−40)
Average precipitation inches (mm)	0.97 (25)	1.00 (25)	1.92 (49)	3.13 (80)	4.37 (111)	5.57 (141)	4.64 (118)	4.66 (118)	3.68 (93)	2.60 (66)	1.67 (42)	1.24 (31)	35.45 (899)
Average snowfall inches (cm)	9.4 (24)	10.6 (27)	6.4 (16)	1.6 (4.1)	0.2 (0.51)	0.0 (0.0)	0.0 (0.0)	0.0 (0.0)	0.0 (0.0)	0.1 (0.25)	4.9 (12)	10.1 (26)	43.3 (109.86)
Average extreme snow depth inches (cm)	11.0 (28)	11.5 (29)	9.6 (24)	1.6 (4.1)	0.0 (0.0)	0.0 (0.0)	0.0 (0.0)	0.0 (0.0)	0.0 (0.0)	0.0 (0.0)	2.6 (6.6)	8.3 (21)	14.7 (37)
Average precipitation days (≥ 0.01 in)	7.0	5.5	7.5	9.8	12.2	12.1	10.3	10.0	8.4	8.2	6.0	7.2	104.2
Average snowy days (≥ 0.1 in)	5.4	4.4	3.0	0.9	0.0	0.0	0.0	0.0	0.0	0.1	1.8	5.1	20.7
Source 1: NOAA
Source 2: National Weather Service (mean maxima/minima 1981–2010)

== Demographics ==
Historical population
Census	Pop.	Note	%±
1870	3,045		—
1880	5,415		77.8%
1890	6,520		20.4%
1900	7,868		20.7%
1910	9,001		14.4%
1920	11,089		23.2%
1930	12,767		15.1%
1940	14,527		13.8%
1950	16,028		10.3%
1960	16,926		5.6%
1970	16,595		−2.0%
1980	16,241		−2.1%
1990	17,085		5.2%
2000	20,818		21.8%
2010	23,352		12.2%
2020	24,453		4.7%
2022 (est.)	24,518		0.3%
U.S. Decennial Census; 2020 Census

=== 2020 census ===
As of the 2020 census, Faribault had a population of 24,453 and a population density of 1,577.4 inhabitants per square mile (609.0/km^{2}). The median age was 37.3 years. 24.4% of residents were under the age of 18, and 16.1% of residents were 65 years of age or older. For every 100 females, there were 114.5 males, and for every 100 females age 18 and over, there were 117.4 males age 18 and over.

97.5% of residents lived in urban areas, while 2.5% lived in rural areas.

There were 8,612 households in Faribault, of which 31.3% had children under the age of 18 living in them. Of all households, 42.4% were married-couple households, 20.1% were households with a male householder and no spouse or partner present, and 28.9% were households with a female householder and no spouse or partner present. About 30.9% of all households were made up of individuals, and 14.4% had someone living alone who was 65 years of age or older.

There were 9,080 housing units, of which 5.2% were vacant. The homeowner vacancy rate was 0.9%, and the rental vacancy rate was 6.0%.

Racial composition as of the 2020 census
Race	Number	Percent
White	16,666	68.2%
Black or African American	3,630	14.8%
American Indian and Alaska Native	297	1.2%
Asian	390	1.6%
Native Hawaiian and Other Pacific Islander	0	0.0%
Some other race	1,602	6.6%
Two or more races	1,868	7.6%
Hispanic or Latino (of any race)	3,415	14.0%

=== 2010 census ===
As of the census of 2010, there were 23,352 people, 8,317 households, and 5,208 families living in the city. The population density was 1,524.3 inhabitants per square mile (588.5/km^{2}). There were 8,946 housing units at an average density of 583.9 per square mile (225.4/km^{2}). The racial makeup of the city was 82.6% White, 7.6% African American, 0.9% Native American, 2.1% Asian, 0.1% Pacific Islander, 4.4% from other races, and 2.3% from two or more races. Hispanic or Latino of any race were 13.0% of the population.

There were 8,317 households, of which 36.4% had children under the age of 18 living with them, 44.5% were married couples living together, 12.4% had a female householder with no husband present, 5.7% had a male householder with no wife present, and 37.4% were non-families. 31.0% of all households were made up of individuals, and 11.7% had someone living alone who was 65 years of age or older. The average household size was 2.50 and the average family size was 3.12.

The median age in the city was 35.4 years. 25.2% of residents were under the age of 18; 9.3% were between the ages of 18 and 24; 28.5% were from 25 to 44; 23.8% were from 45 to 64; and 13.1% were 65 years of age or older. The gender makeup of the city was 54.1% male and 45.9% female.

=== 2000 census ===
As of the census of 2000, there were 20,818 people, 7,472 households, and 4,946 families living in the city. The population density was 1,644.8 inhabitants per square mile (635.1/km^{2}). There were 7,668 housing units at an average density of 605.8 per square mile (233.9/km^{2}). The ethnic/racial makeup of the city was 89.87% White, 2.69% African American, 0.67% Native American, 1.83% Asian, 0.06% Pacific Islander, 3.33% from other races, and 1.53% from two or more races. Hispanic or Latino of any race were 8.90% of the population.

There were 7,472 households, out of which 34.7% had children under the age of 18 living with them, 50.3% were married couples living together, 11.3% had a female householder with no husband present, and 33.8% were non-families. 28.5% of all households were made up of individuals, and 11.8% had someone living alone who was 65 years of age or older. The average household size was 2.53 and the average family size was 3.10.

In the city, the population was spread out, with 26.2% under the age of 18, 9.9% from 18 to 24, 30.7% from 25 to 44, 19.7% from 45 to 64, and 13.5% who were 65 years of age or older. The median age was 34 years. For every 100 females, there were 106.8 males. For every 100 females age 18 and over, there were 106.6 males.

The median income for a household in the city was $40,865, and the median income for a family was $49,662. Males had a median income of $32,404 versus $24,046 for females. The per capita income for the city was $18,610. About 5.8% of families and 9.0% of the population were below the poverty line, including 7.9% of those under age 18 and 13.1% of those age 65 or over.

== Economy ==
Faribault has a gamut of retail and service shops. Employers also include an assortment of light manufacturing concerns.

The main street, Central Avenue, is seeing a renaissance of redevelopment, with most of the commercial block listed on the National Register of Historic Places. Many buildings are being restored to their original appearance. Among them is the Paradise Center for the Arts, a multipurpose art center that is the result of a merger between the Faribault Art Center and the Faribault Area Community Theatre. Two longtime Faribault retailing/shopping institutions have closed. Jim & Joe's Clothiers closed after 125+ years of service due to a number of related factors. Minnick's Food Market, Faribault's last mom-and-pop grocery store, closed in 2006 after 60+ years of operation.

Herbert Sellner, a woodworker and maker of water slides, invented the Tilt-A-Whirl in 1926 at his Faribault home. Over the next year, the first 14 Tilt-A-Whirls were built in his basement and yard. In 1927, Sellner Manufacturing opened its factory in Faribault, and the ride debuted that year at the Minnesota State Fair.

Founded in 1865, the Faribault Woolen Mills stayed in operation until 2009. Reopened in 2011, it is one of the United States' few remaining vertical woolen mills, taking raw wool and producing finished goods.

SAGE Electrochromics, a specialized window glass developer and wholly owned subsidiary of Saint-Gobain, is based in Faribault.

The Minnesota Correctional Facility - Faribault is a state prison on the campus of the former Faribault State Hospital (aka "The State Schools").

== Arts and culture ==
The Thomas Scott Buckham Memorial Library is the city library.

The Rice County Historical Society is in Faribault.

== Parks and recreation ==
The River Bend Nature Center is a 750-acre (3.0 km^{2}) nonprofit nature center in Faribault's southeast corner.

== Government ==
United States presidential election results for Faribault
Year	Republican		Democratic		Third party(ies)	
Year	No.	%	No.	%	No.	%
1992	2,504	32.12%	3,357	43.06%	1,935	24.82%
1996	2,120	29.58%	4,087	57.02%	961	13.41%
2000	3,264	41.20%	4,079	51.49%	579	7.31%
2004	4,195	45.81%	4,814	52.57%	148	1.62%
2008	4,054	44.42%	4,852	53.16%	221	2.42%
2012	4,109	44.71%	4,857	52.85%	225	2.45%
2016	4,669	50.35%	3,847	41.48%	758	8.17%
2020	5,246	51.35%	4,692	45.93%	278	2.72%

Faribault is in Minnesota's 1st congressional district, represented by Brad Finstad, a Republican. On the state level, Faribault is in District 19, represented by Republican Representative Keith Allen and Republican Senator John Jasinski.

== Education ==
Faribault Public Schools, a school district that covers the entire municipality, operates an early childhood center, four elementary schools (one of which is a charter school), a middle school, Faribault High School, the Area Learning Center, and Faribault Education Center, which offers adult education. Students come from Faribault and surrounding communities and rural areas. The Cannon River STEM School, a K-8 charter school, operated from 2009 to 2025.

The Minnesota State Academies for the Deaf and for the Blind, including the State Library for the Blind, are in southeastern Faribault, above the Straight River. Noyes Hall, a neoclassical building on the campus of Minnesota State Academy for the Deaf, is listed on the National Register of Historic Places. The building is named for Jonathon L. Noyes, the school's longtime administrator.

Shattuck-Saint Mary's is a coeducational college preparatory boarding school especially noted for its Centers of Excellence program in hockey, winning numerous youth national championships and producing several NHL and Olympic team players.

South Central Community College, a Minnesota State Colleges and Universities System institution, has a campus in Faribault.

== Media ==
The major daily newspaper in the area is the Faribault Daily News.

Radio stations include:

- 95.9 FM, KQCL, classic rock
- 107.5 FM, KBGY, classic country
- 920 AM, KDHL, classic country

== Infrastructure ==
In 2023, the United States Department of Justice awarded the Faribault Police Department a grant of $300,000, with which it bought a crime scene scanner and installed ten automatic license plate readers.

== Notable people ==
- Howard Bachrach (1920–2008), virologist and foot-and-mouth disease researcher
- George Ballis (1925–2010), photographer and activist whose photos documented the efforts of César Chávez and formation of United Farm Workers
- Orville E. Birnstihl (1917–2015), Minnesota state representative, businessman, and farmer
- Deming Bronson (1894–1957), Medal of Honor recipient
- Stephen Chatman, Canadian composer, born in Faribault in 1950
- Richard Cross, operatic bass-baritone
- Mark Dusbabek, NFL player
- Patrick Eaves, National Hockey League player for Detroit Red Wings; born in Calgary, Alberta but grew up in Faribault
- David Wallace Illsley (1864–1951), Minnesota state legislator and farmer
- Marsha Johnson Luknic (1943–1992), Minnesota state legislator and businesswoman
- Tom Lieb (1899–1962), Olympic track and field athlete, All-American college football player and multi-sport coach
- Mike Mason (1958–), former pitcher for the Texas Rangers
- Diana E. Murphy (1934–2018), United States judge
- Jake Petricka, Major League Baseball pitcher
- Roy W. Ranum, Minnesota state senator
- Bruce Smith, 1941 Heisman Trophy winner
- Ursula Batchelder Stone (1900–1985), professor, civic leader in Chicago
- Elizabeth Strohfus, aviator
- Arnin O. Sundet (1904–1980), businessman and Minnesota state legislator
- Wendy Shon, member of South Korean group Red Velvet, lived in Faribault from 2007 to 2010
- Charles H. Whipple, US Army brigadier general
- Henry Benjamin Whipple, first Episcopal bishop of Minnesota
- Kuoth Wiel (1990–), South-Sudanese-American model and actress
- Raphael Louis Zengel, Faribault-born winner of Victoria Cross for actions performed with Canadian Expeditionary Force during World War I

== See also ==
- Bethlehem Academy
