= Little Crow =

Chief of Kaposia band of Wahpekute (c. 1810 – 1863)

- Thaóyate Dúta
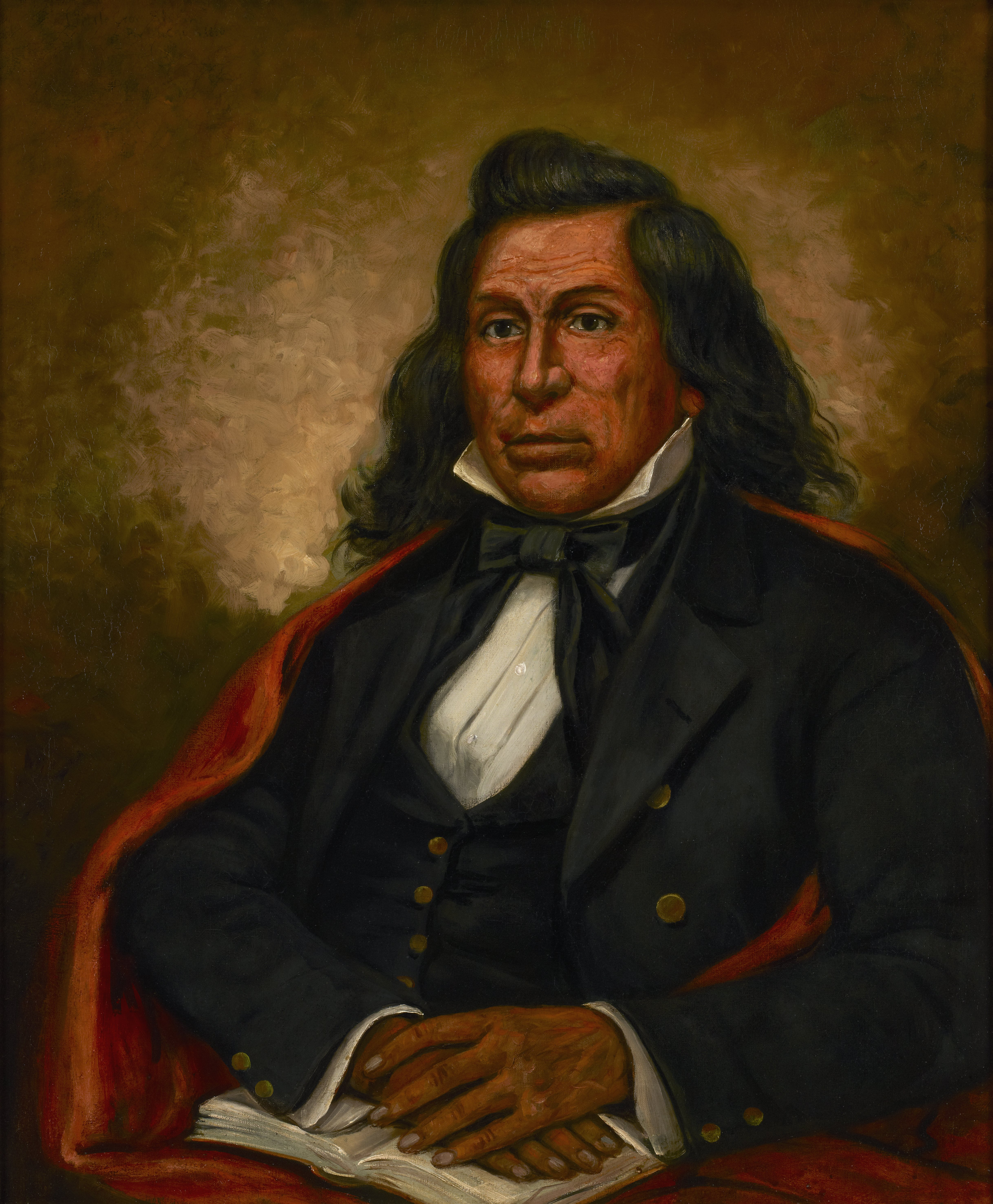
- Thaóyate Dúta, known as Little Crow, portrait by Henry H. Cross
- Born: c. 1810; Kaposia (now in South St. Paul, Minnesota)
- Died: July 3, 1863; Minnesota
- Known for: Dakota chief Leader in Dakota War of 1862
- Spouse(s): Mazaiyagewin (Iron Cluster Woman); Saiceyewin (Isabelle Wakeman); Makatowin (Blue Earth, Eva Rice); Manikiyahewin
- Children: Thomas Wakeman (Wowinape); Emma; Jane Williams; Hannah Redearth; William Cleveland; John A. Little Crow (WoinapeII or younger Woinape captured with Thomas at Fort Snelling)

Little Crow III (Dakota: Thaóyate Dúta; c. 1810 – July 3, 1863) was a Wahpekute Dakota chief who led a faction of the Dakota in a five-week war against the United States in 1862.

In 1846, after surviving a violent leadership contest with his half-brothers, Taoyateduta became chief of his band and assumed the name Little Crow. He played a pivotal role in signing the 1851 Treaty of Mendota which ceded most of their lands in present-day Minnesota and Iowa to the United States. In 1858, Little Crow led a delegation of Dakota leaders to Washington, D.C., where they were pressured by the U.S. government to give up their remaining holdings north of the upper Minnesota River. Faced with anger and mistrust at home, Little Crow lost an election for tribal spokesman in 1862, after which he tried to change his traditionalist ways.

That summer, severe economic hardship, starvation, and tensions with government Indian agents, fur traders, and a fast-growing population of European and American settlers led to unrest among the Dakota, particularly the younger generation of hunters. On August 17, 1862, four Dakota hunters killed five Anglo-American settlers including two women. Fearing punishment, they pleaded for help from a faction of Dakota chiefs and headmen who wanted an all-out war to drive settlers out of the region. Their chosen leader was Little Crow, who initially tried to dissuade them. He pointed out the futility of fighting against the "white men," but finally agreed to lead them. Little Crow pledged to die with them and triggered the massacre of hundreds of settlers, as well as the capture of nearly 300 "mixed-blood" and white hostages, almost all women.

Little Crow met significant opposition from many Dakota, particularly farmers and Christian converts, who preferred to maintain peace with the United States, objected to the killing of civilians, and wanted to free the captives. In September, Little Crow exchanged a series of messages with Colonel Henry Hastings Sibley offering to negotiate, but Sibley refused to begin talks until the hostages were released. Although the demands of the American Civil War slowed the U.S. military response, the volunteer army under Sibley defeated Little Crow's forces decisively at the Battle of Wood Lake on September 23, 1862.

Following his defeat, Little Crow prevented his followers from attacking other Dakota or killing the hostages, and fled with a group of them to the northern plains. He hoped to gain support from other Native American tribes, as well as the British in Canada. Rebuffed by other tribes and left with a dwindling number of supporters, Little Crow returned to Yellow Medicine with his son Wowinape in late June 1863. Little Crow was shot and killed on July 3, 1863, by two settlers, a father and son. They scalped him and took his body to Hutchinson, Minnesota, where it was displayed and mutilated. The state paid the father $500 for killing Little Crow, and paid the son $75 for his scalp.

Little Crow's remains were later exhumed by Army troops. In 1879, the Minnesota Historical Society put his remains on display at the Minnesota State Capitol, but removed them in 1915 at the request of Little Crow's grandson, Jesse Wakeman. In 1971, the society finally returned Little Crow's remains to the Wakeman family for proper burial at the First Presbyterian Church and Cemetery. Little Crow's burial site was listed on the National Register of Historic Places in 2017.

== Early life ==
There were at least three chiefs called Little Crow, including Taoyateduta's grandfather Cetanwakanmani (Čhetáŋ Wakhúwa Máni, literally "Hawk that hunts walking") who was called "Petit Corbeau" by the French; his father Wakinyantanka ("Big Thunder"); and most famously, Taoyateduta himself. The exact origins of the European name "Little Crow" are unclear. Some have suggested that it was a mistranslation of "Sparrowhawk" or "Charging Hawk," while others have explained that the men were known to carry the skin or wings of a crow on their backs or dangling from their belts as a totem.

His Dakota name, Thaóyate Dúta, is most often translated as "His Red Nation"; other variations include "His Red People" and "His Scarlet Nation." There is considerable speculation about his year of birth. While his gravestone lists his birth year as 1818, historian Gary Clayton Anderson concludes that it seems most likely that he was born in 1810, based on mission school records and the fact that Taoyateduta served as a warrior in the Dakota Sioux contingent enlisted by the United States in the Black Hawk War of 1832.

He was one of at least ten boys born to Big Thunder (Wakiŋyaŋtaŋka) Little Crow II and his three wives. Taoyateduta is believed to have been the son of Big Thunder's first wife, Miniokadawin, who was from Wabasha's band. He grew up with a physiological oddity, a double row of teeth.

=== Early years in Kaposia ===
Taoyateduta was born at the Wahpekute Dakota village of Kaposia, also known as Little Crow's village. Over the years, Kaposia most likely had many locations on the east side of the Mississippi River, but is thought to have been in the area between Wakan Tipi and the Pigs Eye wetlands, just below present-day Indian Mounds Park, around the time of Taoyateduta's birth.

Following the 1837 land cession treaty signed between the Mdewakanton Dakota, Wahpekute Dakota and the United States, the Kaposia band, the only Wahpekute band located in the ceded area, moved across the river from the wetlands to what is now South St. Paul.

As a young man, Taoyateduta left Kaposia for the west. At the time, he was unpopular with his father's band due to his arrogant behavior, especially toward his half-brothers. He was said to have been forced out because some men had threatened to kill him for having had affairs with their wives. For over a decade, Taoyateduta visited Kaposia very rarely and only for a short time.

=== Lac qui Parle years ===
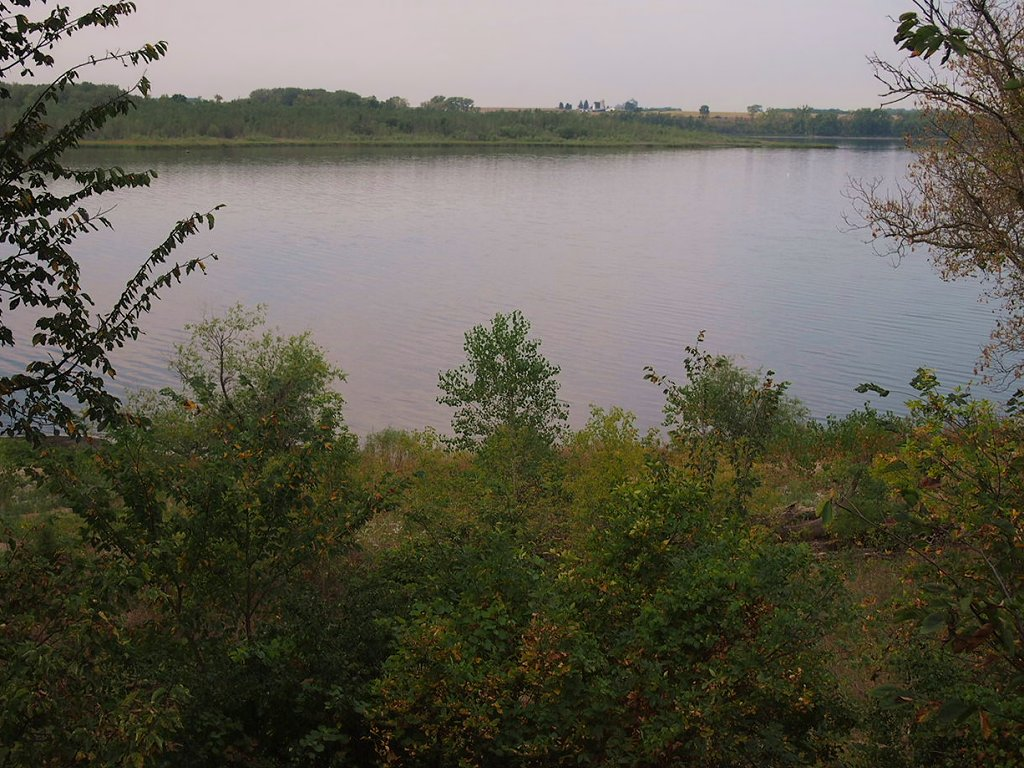
Lac qui Parle view from Fort Renville

Once Taoyateduta was married, he was said to have abandoned his "bad habits." He lived for a time on the Des Moines and Cannon Rivers with the Wahpekute, where he took two wives – daughters of a Wahpekute chief, most likely Tasagye (The Cane) – and had at least three children. By 1838, he had left the Wahpekute and parted ways with his first two wives. He moved further west and settled in Lac qui Parle where he married the four daughters of Inyangmani, a Wahpeton chief, with whom he would have at least twenty more children. Taoyateduta would later be remembered by physician Dr. Asa W. Daniels as a devoted father who was especially proud of his eldest son and "had a natural love for children."

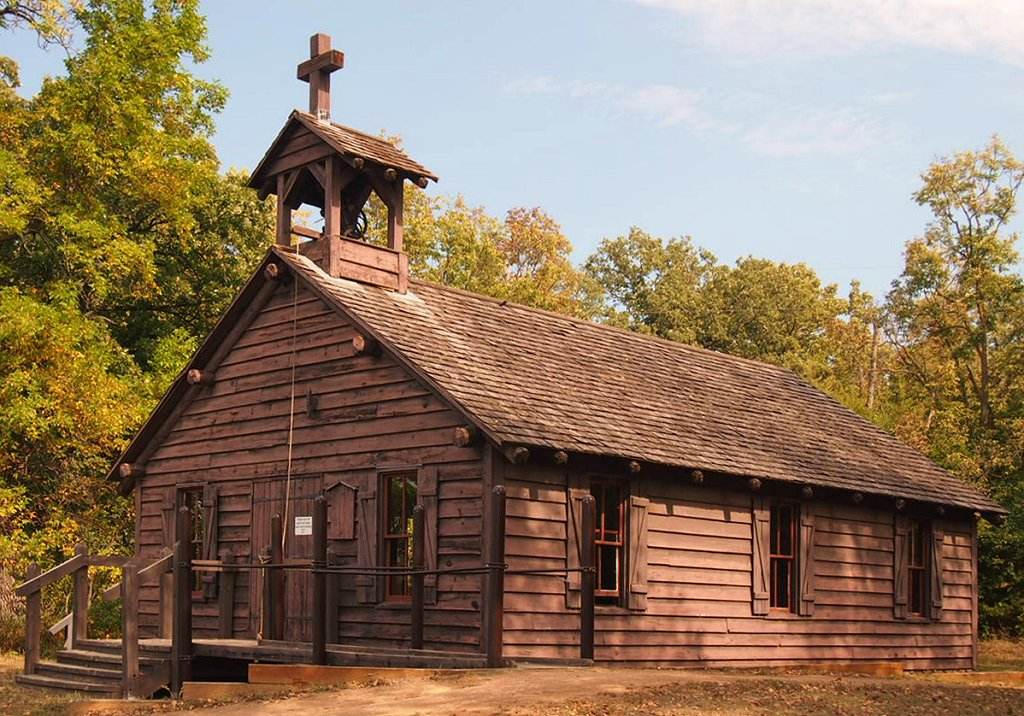
Lac qui Parle Mission (reconstructed)

Lac qui Parle was also home to a large Dakota community, including many of Taoyateduta's relatives such as Mary Tokanne Renville (wife of Joseph Renville, whose mother was also from the Kaposia band) and her brother Left Hand. There, Taoyateduta learned to read and write in the Dakota language, as well as some English and arithmetic. He studied with Gideon Hollister Pond in 1837, and attended classes at the Presbyterian mission school through 1844–45. In addition, he attended church at the Lac qui Parle Mission and showed an interest in learning about Christianity, although he did not give up his native religion or customs. Two of Taoyateduta's wives converted to Christianity, though they later left the church, and missionary Stephen Return Riggs wrote at the time that he thought Taoyateduta himself could be saved.

During this time, Taoyateduta also engaged in the liquor trade, transporting alcohol to the west to trade for fur or horses. It was a lucrative source of income for many fur traders including Joseph Renville and Joseph R. Brown. Taoyateduta was a shrewd entrepreneur who was good with numbers; he was fond of gambling and apparently had a system for winning poker, "a skill for which he had few equals, white or Indian." Dr. Daniels described Taoyateduta's memory as "remarkably retentive" and argued that in later years, it enabled him "to state accurately promises made years before to these Indians and by government officials and to give the exact amount of money owing them, to the dollar and cent."

In 1841, Taoyateduta went on a hunting trip with Henry Hastings Sibley, the regional manager of the American Fur Company, "mixed-blood" fur trader Alexander Faribault, and many others. Sibley and his friends were mounted on horses and pursued a large herd of more than a thousand elk at a steady pace for five days; Taoyateduta kept up on foot the entire way, conversing with them as they covered 25 miles each day, and impressed everyone with his stamina. Historian Anderson writes, "The incident also showed that Taoyateduta was a man who, when he chose to participate in an event, was willing to exert whatever effort was required to impress others."

During his Lac qui Parle years, Taoyateduta's reputation suffered from his association with friends and hunting partners such as Jack Frazer, a "mixed-blood" hunter who had grown up with the Dakota and also became a close friend of Henry Sibley. Among Dakota elders, Frazer was known as a "rather disreputable fellow...sacrilegious, constantly poking fun at Dakota customs, and even mimicking Dakota spirits," and was notorious for his cavalier attitude toward authority. Other complaints against Taoyateduta were that he was "lazy," preferring to deal in furs rather than hunt himself because it was more profitable, and that he did not join war parties against the Ojibwe, except on one occasion. However, Taoyateduta had also gained many admirers in Lac qui Parle "because of his smooth speech, agreeable manners, and rare good judgment."

== Fight for chieftainship ==
=== Death of Big Thunder ===
Back in Kaposia, Taoyateduta's father, Big Thunder (Wakinyantanka), was mortally wounded in October 1845 after accidentally discharging a gun. The old chief, together with one of his wives and two or three grandsons, had set out with an ox-drawn cart to gather some newly ripened corn in his field on the hill behind Kaposia village. As the cart went up the hill, the loaded gun started to slide toward the back of the cart, which was open. Big Thunder caught the gun by the muzzle and was drawing it toward him when it went off. He was taken back to Kaposia to see the medicine man. Surgeon George F. Turner also came from Fort Snelling to examine him, but there was nothing either the medicine man or the surgeon could do to save him. Big Thunder died three days later.

Before he died, Wakinyantanka named one of Taoyateduta's younger half-brothers as his successor, saying that he was not pleased with Taoyateduta, even though he was next in line to be named chief. He also gave his medals – including a presidential medal that had been given to his own father, Cetanwakanmani, after he visited Washington, D.C. in 1824 – to the younger brother as a symbol that he was now the chosen leader of the band.

(Twenty-seven years later, Henry Hastings Sibley claimed that he had witnessed Big Thunder speaking to Taoyateduta at his deathbed, not his younger brother. However, historian Return Ira Holcombe, who compiled eyewitness testimony from at least nine other sources including members of Little Crow's family, wrote that Sibley's claim conflicted with all other accounts of Big Thunder's death, which stated that Taoyateduta was more than 200 miles away at the time of his father's death; that he did not learn of his father's death until at least two weeks later; and that he did not return to Kaposia from Lac qui Parle until months afterwards. Gary Clayton Anderson suggests that it could have been a case of mistaken identity and that back in 1845, Sibley was perhaps unable to tell Taoyateduta apart from his brother.)

=== Return to Kaposia ===
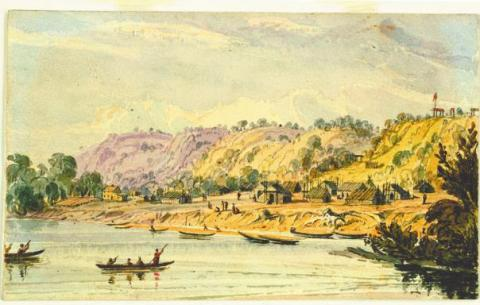
Kaposia village (c. 1846–1848)

After learning of his father's death, Taoyateduta spent the fall and winter carefully planning his return to Kaposia. Taoyateduta believed he was entitled to claim the role of chief, but had learned that two of his half-brothers were willing to fight him to the death. They had declared that Taoyateduta's absence from Kaposia for over a decade disqualified him from taking over. However, Taoyateduta learned that there were others in Kaposia who would support him as chief of the band; they understood that he was no longer "foolish" and had changed his ways.

Taoyateduta waited until the spring of 1846 for his return. Once the ice had melted, he descended the Minnesota River from Lac qui Parle. He had organized a large group of friends and relatives to accompany him, including Mdewakantons such as his cousin Lorenzo Lawrence, a "full-blood" Dakota whose family were Christian converts; several Wahpetons; and three of his wives. As they approached the villages of Shakopee and Black Dog, a growing number of supporters were encouraged to join them. By the time they reached Kaposia, Taoyateduta was accompanied by a sizable flotilla of canoes. Word had reached Kaposia ahead of their arrival, and a large crowd met them on the riverbank.

Armed with guns, Taoyateduta's two half-brothers warned him not to land, threatening, "If you do, you shall die." As Taoyateduta stepped out of the canoe, his brother shouted, "You are not wanted here. Go and live at Lac qui Parle. You are a Wahpeton now and no longer a Mdewakanton. Go back, or I will shoot." Taoyateduta advanced, folded his arms over his chest, and said loudly: "Shoot then where all can see. I am not afraid and they all know it." His brother fired and hit Taoyateduta, who fell backward into the arms of Tukanmani (Walker Among Sacred Stones), causing Taoyateduta's supporters to rush forward and chase the brothers away.

Fired at close range, the ball had passed through both of Taoyateduta's forearms, breaking his bones; his chest and face were also wounded, but he was still alive. He was taken to see the surgeon at Fort Snelling, who recommended amputation, which Taoyateduta refused. He returned to Kaposia where he was attended by shamans. According to Anderson, "His wounds slowly healed, but for the remainder of his life, Taoyateduta carried the ghastly scars of this attempted assassination. His wrists remained deformed, his hands hung awkwardly from them, and he always covered them. He never regained the total use of his fingers."

Soon afterwards, the village elders decided that Taoyateduta had acted bravely. Many observers agreed that his survival was an indication that he was destined to be chief. The elders sanctioned the execution of Taoyateduta's two half-brothers by his supporters. Taoyateduta thus assumed complete control as chief of the Kaposia band and adopted the name "Little Crow."

== Early years as chief ==
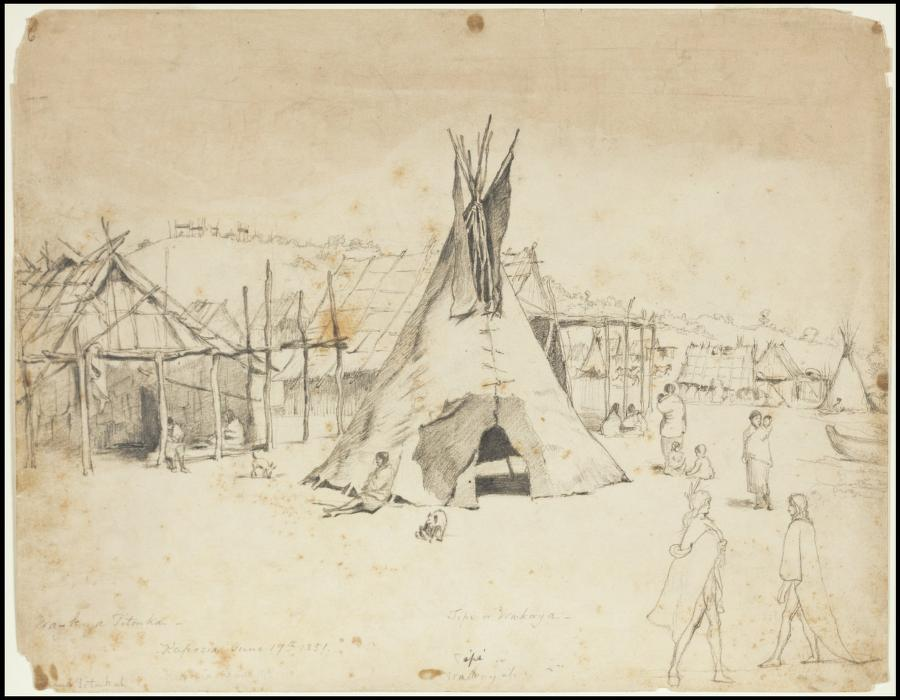
Kaposia village (1851)

As a new chief, it was clear that Taoyateduta took his responsibilities very seriously. He enlisted the help of Indian agent Amos Bruce, who organized temperance pledges at Kaposia. Little Crow himself took the pledge for seven months and became a strong advocate of sobriety. Physician Asa W. Daniels would attest many years later that "Little Crow was a man of good habits; [I] never knew of his using intoxicating liquors." Historian Anderson writes, "Although drinking did not cease entirely, the pledges brought an immediate decrease in the consumption of alcohol, much to the wonderment of many white observers. The success of the program attracted the attention of government authorities, who took notice of Little Crow's increased influence." In the fall of 1846, when reminded of his own years of rebellion and mischief, Little Crow replied: "I was only a brave, then; I am a chief now."

Reverend Thomas Smith Williamson, M.D. opened a Dakota mission school in Kaposia at Little Crow's request

One of his next moves was to invite Reverend Thomas Smith Williamson, M.D. to move to Kaposia from Lac qui Parle. Williamson arrived in Kaposia and established both a church and a Dakota school, hopeful that having the backing of an important chief would encourage more Wahpekutes to convert to Christianity. Once he arrived, he discovered that Little Crow had persuaded the village elders to accept missionaries because of Williamson's medical background, which would have many benefits, including securing vaccinations for smallpox. To his disappointment, Little Crow himself showed no interest in attending church, and only a handful of attendees went regularly.

=== Education in Kaposia ===
Little Crow's main motive for inviting Williamson was probably education. He valued the education he had received at the mission school in Lac qui Parle, and wanted a similar experience for his own children in Kaposia. His Wahpekute relatives from Lac qui Parle who had moved with him to Kaposia, such as Lorenzo Lawrence, had also lobbied for schools, even though the villagers themselves had opposed education in the past. During the winters of 1846–47 and 1847–48, Little Crow and two of his younger half-brothers regularly attended Williamson's new mission school in Kaposia. In the first year, 54 students enrolled, with an average of 12 students attending classes on any given day. By the second year, average daily attendance was up to 30 students a day. One of the late Joseph Renville's daughters, Marguerite Renville, taught most of the classes.

However, trouble began after Indian agent Bruce recommended in 1847 that the government offer its own educational programs in the Wahpekute villages. The 1837 land cession treaty signed with the United States had specified that US$5,000 a year would be set aside in an educational fund for the Wahpekute Dakota controlled by the government, instead of being paid out in annuities. Very little of this money had been spent, and soon there were disputes over how exactly the educational fund should be allocated. As word spread that schools would be built, the traders encouraged the Dakota to oppose them, hoping that if enough people complained, the government would have no choice but to distribute the funds to individuals rather than investing in schools, which would in turn benefit the traders. Suspicion also grew as to whether the missionaries had been benefitting from the educational fund all along. Williamson denied that he was interested in any government support, although he had received small grants in the past. Little Crow once again threw his support behind the mission school in January 1849, but by the spring of 1849, even the chief and his supporters seemed to have lost interest, and stopped attending classes.

Williamson, with the support of the American Board of Commissioners for Foreign Missions, then decided to experiment with boarding schools as a means of encouraging more Dakota children to stay in school. Little Crow supported his efforts and sent two of his children to live with Williamson, including his eldest son, Wowinape, and his daughter Emma. Wowinape was two or three years old when he first entered the boarding school in 1849, but Little Crow temporarily withdrew him, explaining that some villagers had threatened to poison his son if he were permitted to stay with the missionaries. Wowinape returned to the boarding school along with Emma from 1850 to 1851, but the children were taken out of school again after one year. Historian Anderson writes, "Little Crow was never able to win over the opponents to education in his village, and as the debate over schools brought threats to his children's safety, the Kaposia chief began to vacillate in his support of education."

=== Trading and hunting ===
With growing opposition to schools, Little Crow once again focused his energies on trading and gambling for furs in the west. According to fur trader Martin McLeod, in 1848, Little Crow and nearly everyone in Kaposia were allegedly involved in trading whisky for furs, a venture which put them in direct competition with Henry Hastings Sibley and his traders. Sibley, McLeod and others attempted to patrol the rivers, and eventually got the army involved in stopping any Dakota canoes that might be carrying "contraband," as the activity had been made illegal by statute. McLeod also identified Little Crow and one of his brothers as having had considerable success in gambling for furs within their kinship networks in Lac qui Parle. Furthermore, Little Crow was believed to have been involved in at least one incident of stealing furs from a lodge of Ojibwe who had been found hunting on Dakota lands. By trading and gambling for furs, and sometimes hunting, Little Crow and the men of Kaposia found additional ways to contribute to the village economy rather than relying solely on the farming program and the annuities they were entitled to according to the 1837 land cession treaty signed between the Dakota and the United States.

== Treaty negotiations ==
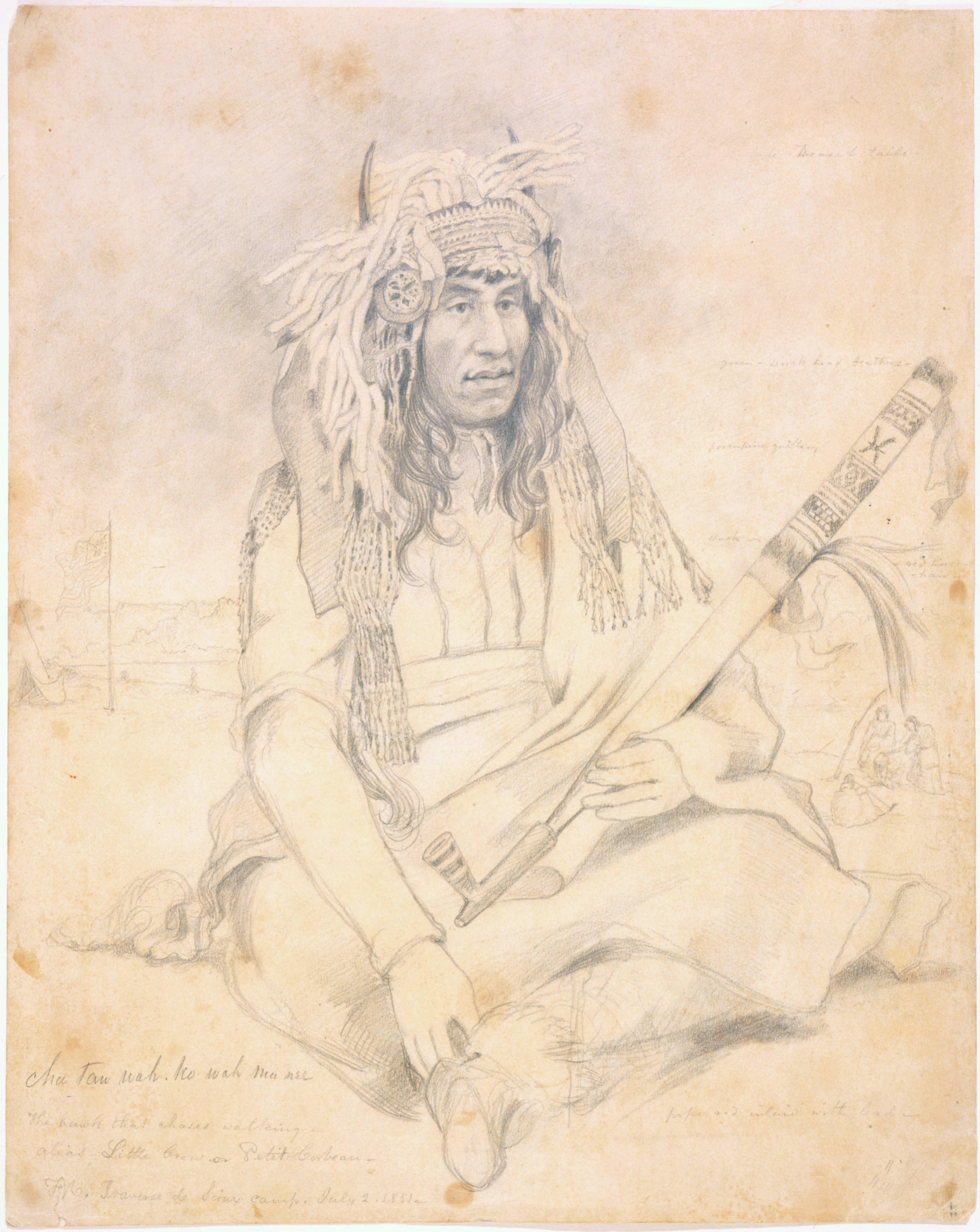
Little Crow (1851) portrait drawn by Frank Blackwell Mayer at Traverse des Sioux, where both men were observers

In 1851, Little Crow played a pivotal role in negotiating the Treaty of Mendota, which stated that the Mdewakanton and Wahpekute bands would receive US$1,410,000, most of which would be held in trust and paid in annuities, for ceding their lands to the U.S. government. The terms of the treaty required them to relocate to a reservation on either side of the Minnesota River. In 1858, he led the Mdewakanton-Wahpekute delegation to Washington, D.C., where Little Crow and other leaders were pressured into giving up the northern half of their remaining holdings along the Minnesota River, as part of a further land cession treaty.

Little Crow was present at Traverse des Sioux and signed the Mendota treaty, by which the bands agreed to move to land set aside along the Minnesota River to the west of their traditional territory. The treaty as ratified by the United States Senate removed Article 3 of the treaty, which had set aside this land. The tribe was compelled to negotiate a new treaty, under threat of forcible removal to the Dakota Territory, and was granted land only on one side of the river.

In the spring of 1862, Little Crow lost the election for speaker of the tribe to Traveling Hail, due to mistrust over his role in negotiating the 1858 treaty and his refusal to endorse the farming program. Devastated by his political defeat, Little Crow started to become more open to changing his religion and way of life to be more like a "white man." However, developments in the summer of 1862 changed everything. Due to the poor harvest the previous year, limited hunting, and the refusal of traders and Indian agents to provide food on credit, many Dakota were starving. Even after the summer harvest started to alleviate the crisis, the failure of the federal government to deliver annuities on time led to widespread anger and distrust, particularly among non-farmers.

Little Crow tried to adapt to customs of the United States. He visited President James Buchanan in Washington, D.C., replaced his native clothing with trousers and jackets with brass buttons, joined the Episcopal Church, and took up farming. However, by 1862, his band was starving. Crops had failed on their small reservation, game was overhunted, and Congress failed to pay the annuities mandated by treaty. Payments were delayed because of the outbreak of the American Civil War. There were rumors that the 'Great Council' of Congress had expended all their gold fighting the Civil War and did not have the money. As the tribe grew hungry and as food languished in traders' warehouses at the Sioux agencies, Little Crow's ability to restrain his people deteriorated.

== Dakota War of 1862 ==
On August 4, 1862, a crowd of Dakota broke into the food warehouse at the Upper Sioux Agency. Lieutenant Timothy J. Sheehan, realizing that peace would not be restored until there was a distribution of food, called for reinforcements from Captain John S. Marsh back at Fort Ridgely. Upon hearing news of the conflict, Little Crow hurriedly rode to Yellow Medicine and took part in discussions the next day with Indian agent Thomas J. Galbraith, missionary Stephen Return Riggs, missionary John P. Williamson, and trader Andrew Myrick. At the council, Little Crow pointed out that Dakota were owed money to buy the food, suggested that Galbraith "make some arrangement" whereby the traders would extend credit, and warned that "When men are hungry, they help themselves." The representative of the traders, Andrew Myrick, replied, "So far as I am concerned, if they are hungry let them eat grass," causing outrage among the Sisseton and Wahpeton who were present. The tense situation was defused following the arrival of Captain John S. Marsh, who instructed agent Galbraith to open his warehouse and told his men to arrest any traders who incited further anger and unrest among the Dakota.

On August 17, 1862, four young Dakota hunters quarreled with a settler and killed five civilians, including two women, near a small settlement called Acton. Fearing punishment, the hunters fled back to Rice Creek Village, where they told their story to Cut Nose, Little Six (Shakopee III) and Red Middle Voice, who were supportive of going to war to drive the settlers out of the region. The group then visited Little Crow in the middle of the night; they viewed Little Crow as the only traditionalist chief with enough political influence and prestige to lead an all-out war. Little Crow initially tried to dissuade them, advising them to consult their elected spokesman and pointing out the futility of going up against the "white men." However, he eventually agreed to lead the warriors, saying "Taoyateduta is not a coward: I will die with you." A council was called, war was declared, and Little Crow ordered an attack the following morning at the Lower Sioux Agency, setting into motion the Dakota War of 1862.

Under Taoyateduta's leadership, the Dakota had some success in the ambush of a small detachment of US troops under Captain Marsh at Redwood ferry, an attack on a burial party in the Battle of Birch Coulee, and killing many unprepared settlers. However, two Dakota attacks on Fort Ridgely were thwarted by soldiers and civilians who, although outnumbered, used the fort's cannon to drive off the attackers. Little Crow was wounded by cannon fire in the second attack on Fort Ridgely, and did not join the attack on New Ulm. The Dakota attacked New Ulm twice, and a collection of settlers and volunteers, although outnumbered, staved off the warriors. Attacks on Forest City, Hutchinson, and Fort Abercrombie were also repulsed. The Dakota attacked white civilians throughout the area.

In the end, Little Crow's forces suffered a rout at the Battle of Wood Lake on September 23, 1862, after which Little Crow and many of his warriors fled west, taking three white boys with them as captives. One of the boys, George Washington Ingalls, age 9 (cousin to author Laura Ingalls) had witnessed the killing and scalping of his father Jedidiah and the capture of his three sisters at the start of the conflict. By late spring 1863, Little Crow and his followers were camped near the Canada–US border. They ransomed the boys in early June 1863, in exchange for blankets and horses.

== Death ==
Wowinape or Thomas Wakeman, son of Little Crow.

Deciding that the tribe must adopt a mobile existence, having been deprived of its territory in the War, Little Crow led a raiding party to steal horses from his former land in Minnesota. His people did not want to do this. On the evening of July 3, 1863, while he and his son Wowinape were picking raspberries, they were spotted by Nathan Lamson and his son Chauncey. The four engaged in a brief firefight. Little Crow wounded the elder Lamson, but was mortally shot by both Lamson and his son. The chief told his own son to flee.

The Lamsons separated, and each traveled the nearly 12 miles to Hutchinson, Minnesota to raise the alarm. The next day, a search party returned and found the body of an unidentified Dakota man. The body wore a coat they recognized as belonging to white settler James McGannon, who had been killed two days before. They scalped the Dakota man, and later brought the body back to Hutchinson. They then dragged his body along the town's Main Street. Firecrackers were placed in his ears and nose and lit. The body was ultimately tossed into a pit at a slaughterhouse. It was later decapitated.

On July 28, 1863, Wowinape was captured by US Army troops in the vicinity of Devil's Lake, Dakota Territory. He told the troops of Little Crow's death. Officials tracked down and exhumed the chief's body on August 16. Little Crow's identity was verified by his scarred wrists. The next year, the Legislature awarded Nathan Lamson $500 for "rendering great service to the State". His son Chauncey Lamson received a $75 bounty for the scalp, although he had taken it the same day that the Adjutant General's bounty on Dakota warriors was declared on July 4, 1863.

The Minnesota Historical Society acquired Little Crow's scalp in 1868, and his skull in 1896. Other bones were collected at other times. These human trophies were displayed publicly for decades. In 1971, the Society returned Little Crow's remains to his grandson Jesse Wakeman (son of Wowinape) for burial. A small stone memorial tablet was installed at the roadside of the field where Little Crow was killed.

== Legacy ==
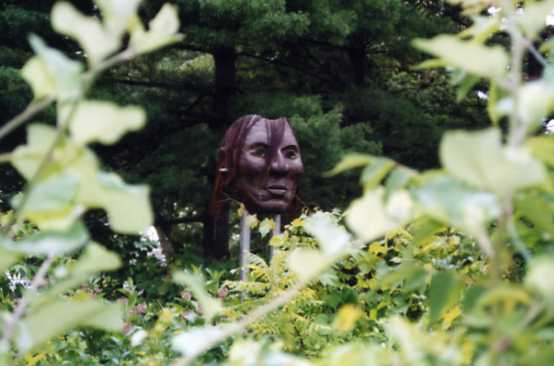
Sculpture mask of Little Crow at Minneapolis

- In 1937, the city of Hutchinson erected a large bronze statue of Little Crow in a spot overlooking the Crow River near the Main Street bridge access to the downtown business district. It was created by local artist Les Kouba, who later became known for his wildlife art.
- In 1971 Jesse Wakeman arranged to have the remains of his grandfather Little Crow reinterred at the First Presbyterian Church and Cemetery in Flandreau, South Dakota. The church and cemetery were listed on the U.S. National Register of Historic Places in 2017.
- In 1982, sculptor Robert Johnson and Kouba created an updated statue of Little Crow for the city of Hutchinson, as the older one was weather beaten. It was removed in 2007 and held at the McLeod County Historical Society in order to allow construction of a new Main Street bridge across the river. Eheim Park was redesigned here, and the statue was planned to be reinstalled in a lower position in 2009, so that viewers could appreciate the symbols on the cape. The statue again overlooks the Crow River.
- A mask commemorating Little Crow was installed near the waterfall in Minnehaha Park in Minneapolis, however the foundry says there is no correlation between Little Crow and the site.

== In popular culture ==
Chief Little Crow appears as one of major supporting characters in the final volume of Złoto Gór Czarnych (Gold of the Black Hills), a trilogy of novels told from the perspective of the Santee Dakota tribe, by Polish author Alfred Szklarski and his wife Krystyna Szklarska.
