= Snana =

Dakota woman also known as Maggie Brass (1839-1908)

Snana (Maggie Brass)
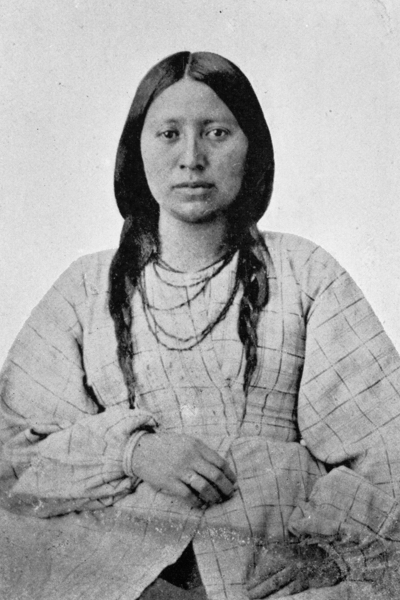
- Born: c. 1839; Mendota, Minnesota
- Died: 1908; Nebraska
- Occupation: Teacher
- Known for: Rescue of Mary Schwandt during the Dakota War of 1862
- Spouse(s): Andrew Good Thunder (married 1854–65); Charles Bass (married until 1894)
- Children: William Brass

Snana (c. 1839–1908), also known as Maggie Brass, was a Mdewakanton Dakota woman who rescued and protected a fourteen-year-old German girl, Mary Schwandt, after she was taken captive during the Dakota War of 1862. She was reunited with Mary Schwandt Schmidt in 1894, leading to a feature article in the St. Paul Pioneer Press. Snana’s narrative of the war, “Narration of a Friendly Sioux,” was edited by historian Return Ira Holcombe and published in 1901.

Snana is one of six Dakota "heroes" commemorated by the Faithful Indians’ Monument in Morton, Minnesota.

== Early life, education, and religion ==
Snana was born in Mendota in 1839. Her Dakota name, Snana, is translated as “Tinkling” or "Ringing Sound."

Both she and her mother, Wamnuka (Barleycorn), were members of the Kaposia band of Mdewakanton Dakota. While she was growing up, Snana lived for a time with her "mixed-blood" relatives, including Mary Brown and Jennie Robertson, and also boarded for a time with the family of Dr. Thomas Smith Williamson. Snana later credited the Williamson family for teaching her to embrace Christianity.

From 1849 to 1852, Snana attended Williamson's Presbyterian mission school at Kaposia village, where she learned to read and write. She also became fluent in English. Snana attended the school despite protests from other villagers, who believed that the school had misappropriated education funds that had been allocated to the Mdewakantons in the Treaty of 1837.

In late 1853, Snana and her mother moved with other Mdewakantons to the Lower Sioux Indian Reservation. Their move from Kaposia, which was near present-day South St. Paul on the upper Mississippi River, to the new reservation on the Minnesota River had been agreed as part of the Treaty of Mendota signed by Chief Little Crow in 1851.

In 1854, at the age of fifteen, Snana married Wakinyanwaste (Good Thunder). Wakinyanwaste offered gifts to her mother in the Dakota tradition, but Snana insisted on marrying in a church. Snana and Wakinyanwaste were married in the Episcopal mission established by Reverend Samuel Dutton Hinman.

In 1861, Snana and her husband became the first Dakotas confirmed as Christians at the Mission of St. John, the Episcopal church at the Lower Sioux Agency. After that, they went by the names Maggie and Andrew Good Thunder. The couple were initially ridiculed by some for their faith. Snana was often seen reading her Episcopal prayer book.

== Dakota War ==
In early August 1862, Maggie and Andrew Good Thunder’s oldest daughter Lydia died at the age of seven. Maggie was grieving when she found out about the initial attacks in the Dakota War of 1862 ordered by Chief Little Crow, leader of her band.

=== Rescue of Mary Schwandt ===
Upon hearing from one her uncles that a "nice looking girl" had been captured, Maggie and her mother arranged to trade her pony for the hostage, fourteen-year-old Mary Schwandt. Mary had been captured while fleeing eight miles from New Ulm with a family she worked for.

Many believe that that prior to being taken under Maggie's protection, Mary was raped, though Mary herself would spend the later years of her life denying the claims implied by her first biographer. Mary Schwandt would later explain that before Maggie and her mother stepped in to "buy" her from her captor, a young Dakota man named Mazzaboomdu (Blows on Iron), she was convinced that he intended to shoot her "for sport."

Maggie Good Thunder sent her mother to negotiate the trade:

When she brought this girl, whose name was Mary Schwandt, she was much larger than the one I had lost, who was only seven years old; but my heart was so sad that I was willing to take any girl at that time. The reason why I wished to keep this girl was to have her in place of the one I lost. So I loved her and pitied her, and she was dear to me just the same as my own daughter.

=== Protection from harm ===
In the weeks that followed, every time Indians were killed, Dakota warriors began to threaten and kill some of the white captives. During these incidents, Maggie and her mother hid Mary under blankets and buffalo robes and would tell the warriors that she had run away. Maggie explained her determination to protect Mary:

I thought to myself that if they would kill my girl they must kill me first. Though I had two of my own children at the time with me, I thought of this girl just as much as of the others.

Maggie dressed Mary in Dakota clothes and beaded moccasins for her, thinking that she was less likely to be hurt that way. However, she would then tell Mary to change out of her Indian clothes every time they heard rumors that the American soldiers were coming. Maggie made a point of staying with Mary at all times to protect her, also with help from her mother. Although Mary did not suffer further abuse once she was under Maggie's protection, on one occasion, three or four drunken Dakota men tried to drag her out of her tent at night while she was sleeping. The noise woke up Maggie, who then drove the men away. Good Thunder was not there. According to Mary:

Maggie sprang up as swiftly as a tigress defending her young, and almost as fierce, and ordered them out. A hot quarrel resulted. They seemed determined to take me away or kill me, but Maggie was just as determined to protect me. I lay in my little couch, trembling in fear and praying for help, and at last good, brave Maggie drove the villains away.

Mary Schwandt said that she called Maggie her "Indian mother." She was aware that Maggie was fluent in English, but that they seldom spoke "because it made the other Indians suspicious." Mary also looked after Maggie's two young children, whom Mary knew as Winona and baby CheeChee. Both Mary and Maggie noted in their respective memoirs that Good Thunder did very little to help take care of Mary, and that he was away most of the time with the other men.

On September 23, 1862, when Chief Little Crow was defeated at the Battle of Wood Lake, Maggie dug a hole in her tent. She hid Mary and her two children in the hole and covered it with poles. She then sat on the poles nonchalantly to protect them while their camp was thrown into pandemonium as many of Little Crow's followers planned to flee to Canada.

In her narrative, Maggie recalled her joy in hearing about the arrival of Colonel Henry Hastings Sibley and his army nearby on September 25, 1862, as well as her sadness in parting with Mary at Camp Release on September 26:

When I turned this dear child over the soldiers my heart ached again; but afterward I knew that I had done something which was right. From that day I never saw her nor knew where she was for thirty-two years, until the autumn of 1894.

== Life after the war ==
After the war, Maggie and Andrew Good Thunder lived at the internment camp at Fort Snelling, where their other two children died.

In the spring of 1863, most Dakota were expelled from Minnesota and were removed to Crow Creek Indian Reservation in present-day South Dakota. However, Good Thunder joined the Sibley expedition as a scout, and Maggie was given permission to move to Faribault, Minnesota.

Around 1865, Snana separated from Good Thunder and moved to the Santee Sioux Reservation in Nebraska, where many Dakota had moved after Crow Creek.

At the Santee Reservation, she married Charles Brass (Mazazezee), a respected Dakota scout, after which she became known as Maggie Brass. They had one son and two adopted daughters. Charles died in 1894 of injuries he received while serving under General Alfred Terry and General George Armstrong Custer.

== Reunion with Mary ==
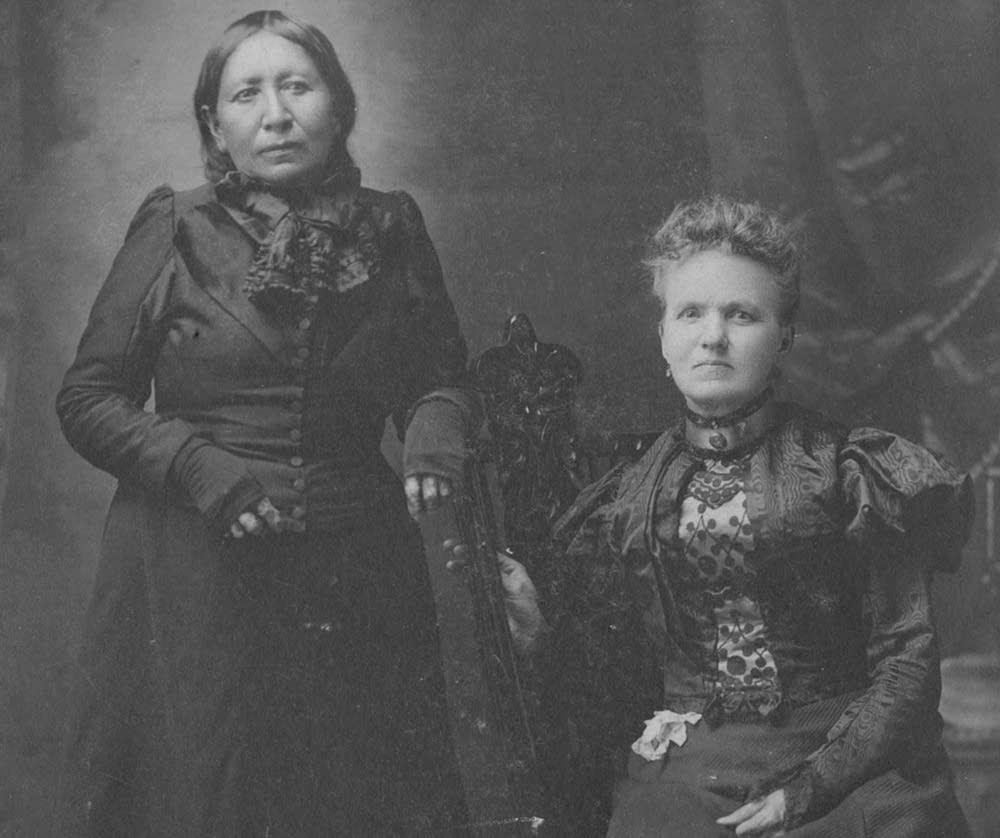
Maggie Brass (Snana) and Mary Schwandt Schmidt, c.1899, taken by Harry Shepherd.

In the fall of 1894, historian Return Ira Holcombe edited and published survivor Mary Schwandt-Schmidt’s narrative in the St. Paul Pioneer Press. In her memoirs, Schwandt-Schmidt included this message for Snana:

I learn that she is somewhere in Nebraska, but wherever you are, Maggie, I want you to know that the little captive German girl you so often befriended and shielded from harm loves you still for your kindness and care, and she prays God to bless you and reward you in this life and that to come.

The matron at the Santee Sioux Reservation saw the article and showed it to Maggie. Maggie Brass wrote a letter to Mary, leading to regular correspondence between the two women. Soon, she was on her way to Saint Paul to meet Mary. Snana said of their reunion, "It was just as if I went to visit my own child." She and Mary became very close and Maggie would continue to visit Mary at her home once a year.

Sensing a scoop, Return Ira Holcombe wrote an article about the two women in the Pioneer Press, and also pushed for Maggie to provide her own story.

=== "Narration of a Friendly Sioux" ===
Snana wrote her story in English and sent to Holcombe in 1894. Her original handwritten draft was titled, "The Story of Maggie Brass and Her Experience in the Sioux Outbreak."

However, in the published version, the title appears as "Narration of a Friendly Sioux: By Snana, the Rescuer of Mary Schwandt"—presumably retitled by Holcombe, who also chose to use her Dakota name. Holcombe edited and annotated Snana's memoir, which was finally published in the Minnesota Historical Society Collections in 1901.

In 1901, Snana and Mary Schmidt were invited to visit Minnesota Governor Samuel Rinnah Van Sant in Saint Paul.

== Faithful Indians' Monument ==
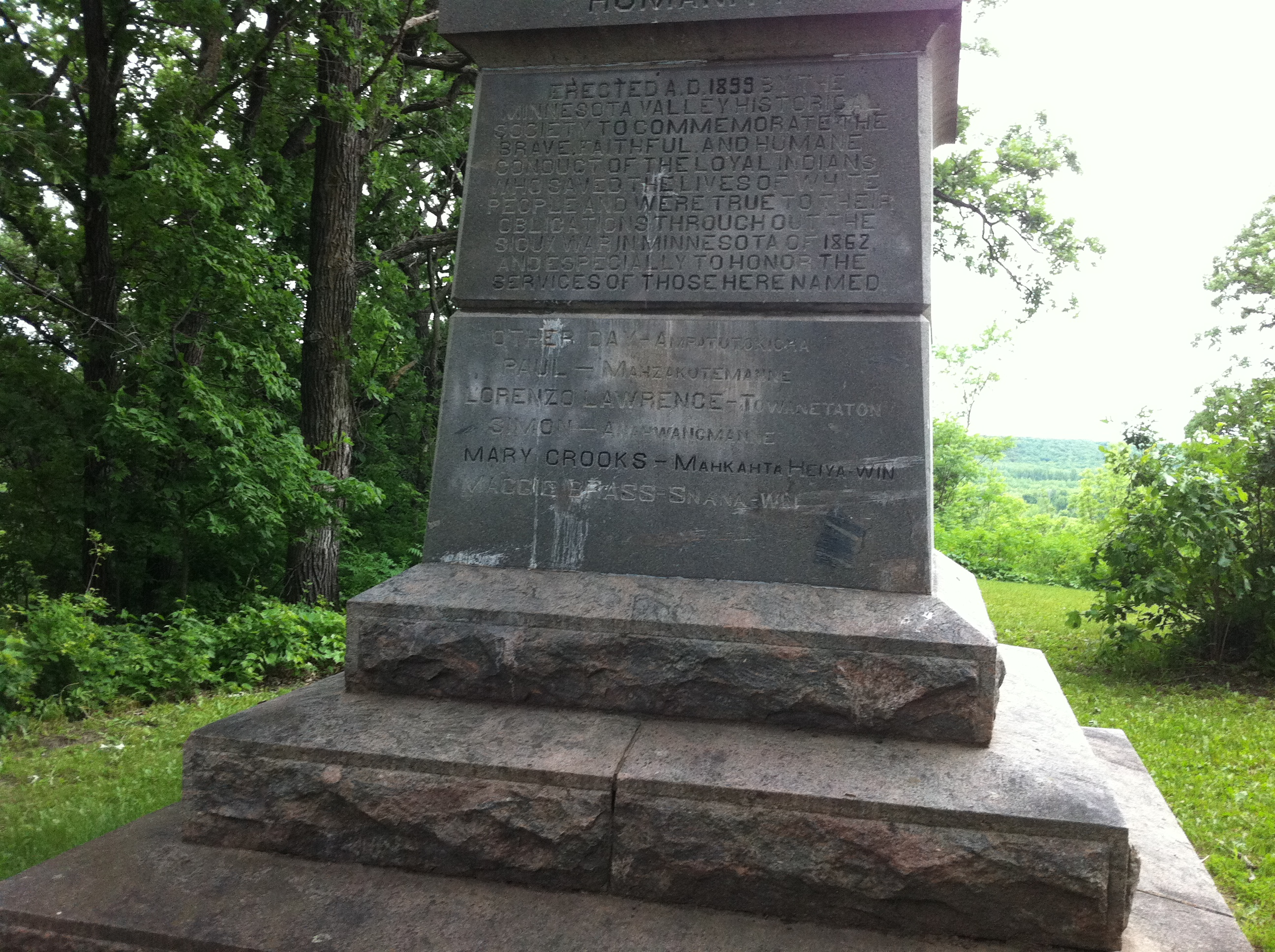
"Maggie Brass — Snana-win" appears at the bottom of the Faithful Indians' Monument

Maggie Brass died on April 24, 1908. After her death, Snana’s name was added to the Faithful Indians’ Monument, in a space that had been reserved for it. The monument is located in Morton, Minnesota near the Birch Coulee Monument.

The monument had been raised in 1899 to recognize “full-blood Sioux Indians” who had been “unbrokenly loyal and who had saved the life of at least one white person.” Snana was chosen as one of six Dakota "heroes" to be honored by the Minnesota Valley Historical Society, which was led by Charles D. Gilfillan as president and Return I. Holcombe as historiographer.
