= Thomas Wakeman =

- Wówinaphe
- Born: Wowinape (to take refuge); 1846; Probably Kaposia
- Died: January 13, 1886 (aged 39–40); Redwood Falls, Minnesota, US
- Spouse: Judith Minnetonka
- Children: 6
- Parent: Little Crow

Thomas Wakeman (Dakota: Wówinaphe; 1846 – January 13, 1886) was a Dakota man based in Dakota Territory who organized the first Sioux Indian YMCA. Over the years, 66 Sioux associations have been founded, and they have more than 1000 members. As of 2000, Sioux YMCAs, under the leadership of a Lakota Board of Directors, operate programs serving families and youth on the 4,500-square-mile (12,000 km^{2}) Cheyenne River Indian Reservation.

== Background ==
Chief Little Crow (Dakota: Thaóyate Dúta, lit. 'His Red Nation') of the Dakota had a son named Wowinape (Dakota: Wówinaphe, lit. 'Place of Refuge') born in 1846. Little Crow and Wowinape survived the Dakota War of 1862 and moved west to Dakota Territory when the Dakota and Winnebago were expelled from southern Minnesota.

They lived at Devil's Lake. On June 10, 1863, they left to make a raid into Minnesota to get horses for their family. On July 3, 1863, Little Crow and his son were in the "Big Woods" picking raspberries. They were spotted by two settlers, Nathan Lamson and his son Chauncey. The four engaged in a brief firefight. Little Crow wounded the elder Lamson, but was mortally shot by both Lamson and his son. The chief told his own son Wowinape to flee. The father and son got the bounty posted against the Sioux, as they had been expelled from the state. Wowinape, who had fled back to Devil's Lake, was later captured, tried and sentenced to hang. He was sent to a prison camp in Davenport, Iowa. There he converted to Christianity and took the name Thomas Wakeman. He was pardoned in 1865 and settled in Dakota Territory.

Wakeman married Judith Minnetonka in January 1874. They had four sons and two daughters: Solomon, Ruth, John, Jesse, Ida, and Alex Wakeman.

== Career ==
On April 27, 1879 Thomas Wakeman and his friends started the Koskad Okodakiciye, a Young Man's Association, at Flandreau, Dakota Territory, now in South Dakota. In 1885, it was recognized by the national YMCA and its name was changed to Sioux YMCA. The term Sioux was used by European Americans, who did not distinguish among the various tribes.

== Death ==
Wakeman contracted tuberculosis and died at Redwood Falls, Minnesota on January 13, 1886. His son Jesse Wakeman succeeded his father at the YMCA.
