= Southeast, Saint Paul =

Neighbourhood in Saint Paul, Minnesota

Southeast, Saint Paul is a neighborhood and city planning district in Saint Paul, Minnesota, in the United States. It is Planning District 1. The area is bounded by Minnehaha Avenue on the north, McKnight Road on the east, city limits to the south, and Birmingham/Etna/Hwy 61 to Warner Road to the Mississippi River on the west. The district consists of four distinct, smaller neighborhoods: Eastview, Conway, Battle Creek, and Highwood. It also includes the industrial areas and wetlands around Pigs Eye Lake.

== History ==
The earliest development in the neighborhood occurred as a result of the Burlington Northern Railroad. In 1886, a group of businessmen purchased 1,200 acres of land in the Highwood area and established a railroad suburb named Burlington Heights. This commuter suburb was planned with large rustic lots separated by curving roads along the river bluffs. It had only limited success though, and resulted in only a handful of homes being built in the late 1800s and early 1900s. It was not until after World War II, with the improvement of highways and proliferation of automobiles, that this part of Saint Paul was settled extensively.

== Features ==
Because most of Southeast was built as a bedroom community, it has more of a suburban environment than the rest of the city. Large natural areas of woodlands, bluffs, wetlands, streams, lakes, and parkland are a distinctive feature of the neighborhood, especially Pig's Eye Regional Park. Southeast has more than 1,000 acres of lakes and open land which provide important wildlife habitat, including breeding areas for eagles, herons, and other species.

The land around Pigs Eye Lake has a long history of pollution due to the dumping of toxic chemicals during the decades between 1920 and 1970. There is a long term plan to clean up the site and rehabilitate the area as a park, and this project has received the attention of lawmakers in recent years who are looking for funding. The area has also been designated an EPA Super Fund site.
