= Henry Cross =

Henry Cross may refer to:

- Henry H. Cross, American painter, hunter, prospector, and frontiersman
- Henry Cross (screenwriter), of Night Train to Paris
- Henry Cross (cricketer), see List of Wellington representative cricketers

== See also ==
- Harry Cross (disambiguation)
