= Kaposia =

Historic Dakota village in St. Paul, Minnesota area

Coordinates: 44.9140°N 93.0548°W

Kaposia (Kapozha)
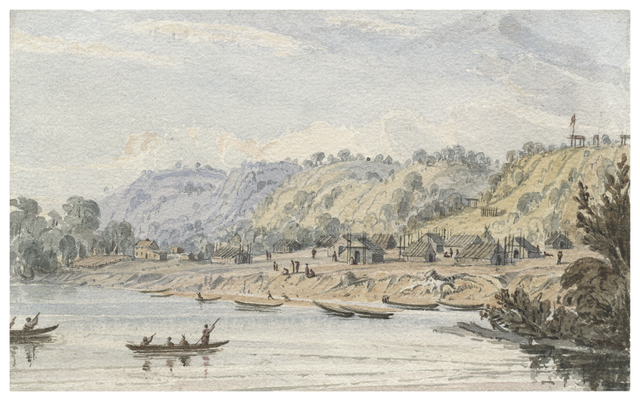
- Watercolor of Kaposia village by Seth Eastman c.1846
- Interactive map of Kaposia (Kapozha)
- Location: Present-day Saint Paul, Minnesota

Kaposia or Kapozha was a seasonal and migratory Dakota settlement, also known as "Little Crow's village," once located on the east side of the Mississippi River in present-day Saint Paul, Minnesota. The Kaposia band of Mdewakanton Dakota was established in the late 18th century and led by a succession of chiefs known as Little Crow or "Petit Corbeau." After a flood in 1826, the band moved to the west side of the river, about nine miles below Fort Snelling.

== History ==
Kaposia translates to "light," "light footed" or "not encumbered with much baggage." Many historians believe that the name infers that the people were traveling "light." Others have speculated that its name was in reference to the band's championship at the game of lacrosse.

=== Location in early 19th century ===
On May 1, 1767, British explorer Jonathan Carver attended an "annual council" of eight bands of Dakota, "possibly at or near a village that would become Kaposia," on the eastern side of the river two miles south of Wakan Tipi in St. Paul.

By 1775, all Mdewakanton bands had established "more or less permanent summer villages." The Kaposia band is believed to have taken residence in the St. Paul area under Chief Cetanwakanmani (c.1769–1833), grandfather of Taoyateduta Little Crow.

American explorer Lieutenant Zebulon Pike visited Kaposia during his 1805–1806 expedition to locate the source of the Mississippi River. Historian Edward J. Lettermann suggests that Kaposia may have been located on what was then an "island," two miles long and up to one mile wide, between Pigs Eye Lake and the Mississippi from this time until the early 1820s. The location was referred to as "The Grand Marais," also by Major Thomas Forsyth, who visited Kaposia in 1819.

Sometime between 1819 and 1823, Cetanwakanmani moved the village to present-day downtown St. Paul near the mouth of Phalen Creek. After the river flooded in 1826, the Kaposia band moved to the west side of the Mississippi River, north of today's downtown South St. Paul. Although there is some uncertainty regarding the exact date, the village most likely moved to the west bank by 1833.

=== Economy ===
Woodworking was an important trade in Kaposia. Kaposia village was well known for making canoes, which were made by hollowing pine trees with axes and adze. Other items they carved included cradles, dishes, spoons and ladles. The village always had cornfields and vegetable gardens nearby, which were cultivated by the women in the band.

== Battle of Kaposia ==
It was the camp the Ojibwe attacked in 1842 that named Battle Creek in St. Paul.

== Land cession treaties ==
With the signing of the 1837 land cession treaty with the United States, Chief Big Thunder Little Crow and other Mdewakanton Dakota leaders relinquished their claims to all land east of the Mississippi River.

In 1851, Taoyateduta Little Crow was the first Mdewakanton Dakota signatory to the Treaty of Mendota with the United States. As a result of the land cessions, all Dakota were forced to move to a reservation on either side of the Minnesota River. The people of Kaposia moved to the proximity of the Redwood Agency, also known as the Lower Sioux Agency.

== Last days of Kaposia ==
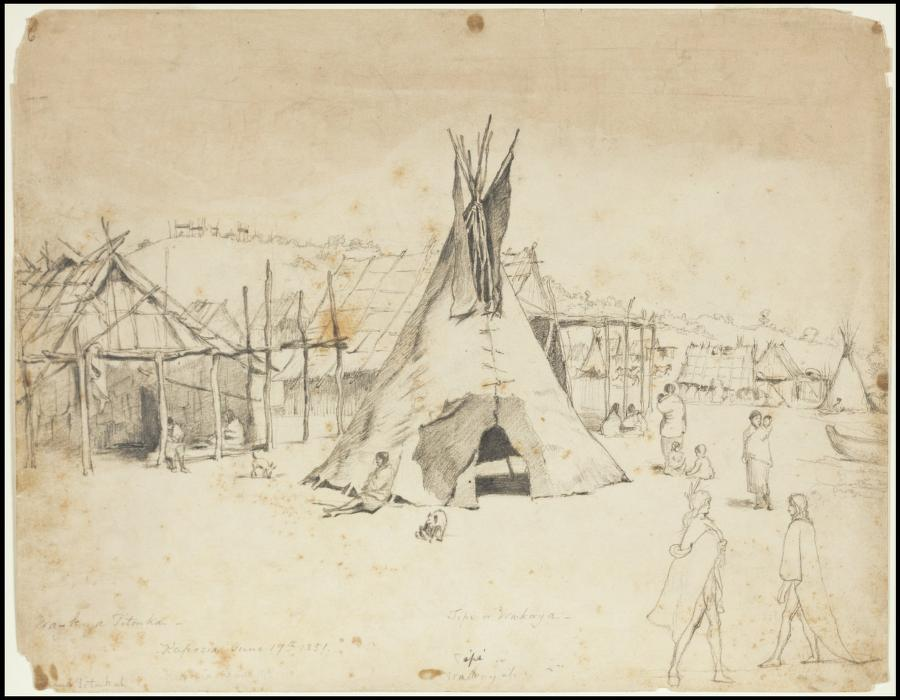
Drawing of Kaposia village in 1851 by Frank Blackwell Mayer

Colonel Seth Eastman painted Kaposia below the southern bluffs of Mounds Park.

In 1851, 23-year-old artist Frank Blackwell Mayer, made a large number of sketches of life in Kaposia village.

In 1854, when Little Crow III visited Washington, DC, he observed John Mix Stanley in his studio arcade. In Little Crow: Spokesman for the Sioux, historian Gary Clayton Anderson writes:

Coincidentally, Stanley was just then finishing a landscape of Kaposia, complete with bark and hide lodges, women dressing. hides, and men carrying canoes to the river. Little Crow was delighted and gazed for a long time at the scene, pointing to familiar sights. But Stanley had also completed a painting of the burial ground near Kaposia, and this picture produced in the chief a more sullen mood. He looked for a long time at the depiction of the dead being mounted on scaffolds, then raised his hands above his head, clasped them, and stalked out of the room. No one watching his reaction even attempted to fathom what had been racing through his mind. No doubt he lamented the fact that he would never again return to that village so poignantly portrayed by Stanley.

== Notable people ==
- Azayamankawin, entrepreneur from Kaposia known as "Old Bets"
- Jacob Fahlström, Methodist preacher first converted at Kaposia mission
- Joseph Renville, mixed-blood fur trader born at Kaposia
- Snana, teacher later known as Maggie Brass who studied with Reverend Dr. Thomas Smith Williamson at Kaposia mission school
- Taoyateduta, chief of Kaposia band from 1846
- Wowinape, raised in Kaposia village from 1846

== Visiting ==
Today there is a historic site marker for Kaposia along North Concord street in South St. Paul. Kaposia Park is situated where the settlement used to exist, and is open to the public.
