= Harry Cross =

Harry Cross may refer to:

- Harry Cross (sportswriter) (1881–1946), American journalist
- Harry P. Cross (1874–1955), American football player and coach
- Harry Cross (Brookside), a character from the British soap opera Brookside
- Ben Cross (1947–2020), English actor (real name Harry Cross)

== See also ==
- Henry Cross (disambiguation)
