= Harry Shepherd (photographer) =

Harry Shepherd (ca. 1854–?) was an African-American photographer in St. Paul, Minnesota from 1880 to 1905. He was the first prominent African-American photographer in Minnesota.

== Biography ==
Harry Shepherd was born around 1854 in Salem, Virginia. He came to Minnesota around 1877 and worked as a newsboy on a steamboat before his career in photography.

=== Photography ===
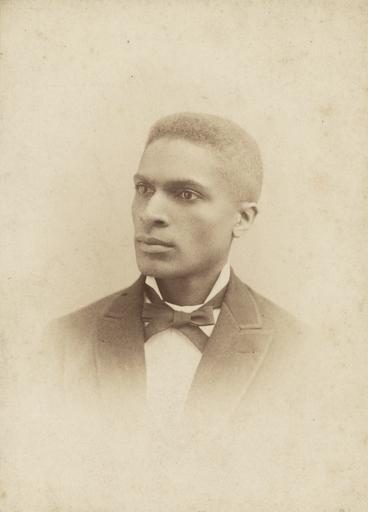
Photo of Fredrick McGhee taken by Shepherd.

Shepherd was the first African-American photographer in Minnesota to own a photographic studio, and described as a leading photographer in St. Paul. He photographed both African and white Americans in Minnesota, including Snana Good Thunder, Frederick McGhee, Ignatius Donnelly, and the entire 1903 state legislature. Throughout his career, he owned and sold at least four photography studios in Saint Paul: the People's Photography Gallery, the Annex or Swanson Gallery, the Elite Gallery, and the Shepherd Photographic Company. By 1889, he employed eight people in two galleries making cabinet portraits, tintypes, photos on ivory, on watch dials, on silk handkerchiefs, and other types of photo jewelry. Shepard won gold medals for photography at the Minnesota State Fair and received further recognition throughout the country.

In 1899, Shepherd published the photo collage Our Unsung Heroes showing Black struggle and demanding African-American social equality. This work caught the attention of W. E. B. Du Bois, who hired Shepherd as the official photographer for the Afro-American exhibit at the 1900 World's Fair in Paris. The exhibit was created by Dubois, Booker T. Washington (who Shepherd photographed several times), and Thomas J. Calloway. Shepherd was to travel taking pictures of African American businesses, agriculture, homes, and individuals. However, he lost the appointment due to his radical politics.

=== Politics ===
Shepherd held National Afro-American Council meetings in his studio and attended the NAAC convention in Philadelphia in 1901. As the delegate of the Business Men's Club of St. Paul and Minneapolis, he helped persuade the council to hold their next convention in Minnesota.

In 1902, Shepherd ran for Fourth Ward alderman in St. Paul. He did not take direction from the local Republican Party, who instead endorsed a white candidate. Shephard argued that the party should allow all candidates into a primary and let voters decide, and promised to fight those in his party who opposed him because of his color.

=== Later life ===
Shepherd's wife Margaret sued him for divorce in 1904. In 1905, Shepherd sold his photography studio and his share in the Sangre Chemical Company. He moved to Chicago and established another photography company. In 1909, he relocated to Seattle, Washington and founded the newspaper The Bertillion Eye, and landed a contract to sell shares in a Klondike gold mining venture.

In 1912, he was reportedly the general manager of the International Biographic Finger Print, an Los Angeles magazine. Little is known about the rest of his life.

== Legacy ==
A travelling exhibit "This is the Original and Only Harry Shepherd" was developed by the Centennial Park Conservancy in Nashville, Tennessee. Shepherd won an award for excellence in the Decorative Arts at the Tennessee Centennial Exposition. The exhibit got its name from the slogan printed on his Victorian-era cabinet cards.
