= First Presbyterian Church and Cemetery (Flandreau, South Dakota) =

Historic site in Moody County, South Dakota, US

- U.S. National Register of Historic Places
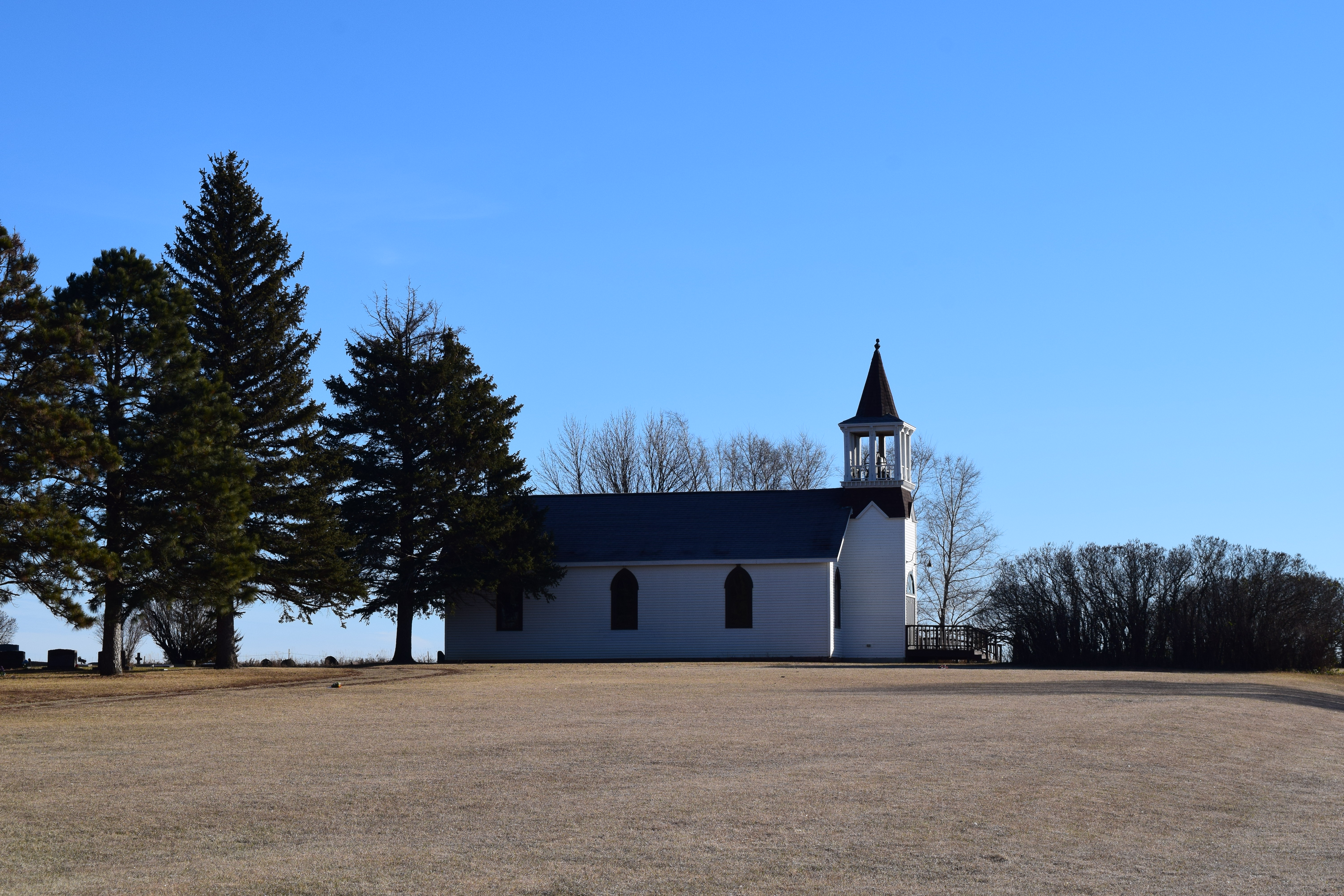

- Location within South Dakota Location within the United States
- Location: 22712 South Dakota Highway 13, near Flandreau, South Dakota
- Coordinates: 44°04′06″N 96°35′08″W
- NRHP reference No.: 100001402
- Added to NRHP: July 31, 2017

The First Presbyterian Church and Cemetery in Flandreau, South Dakota was listed on the National Register of Historic Places in 2017.

Built in 1873, the church was deemed notable for its "significant association with the earliest settlement of the Flandreau homestead colony by the Mdewakanton Dakota American Indians and with the leadership of Rev. John Eastman for his involvement in the religious, social and political life of the community." The cemetery was deemed notable for its graves, including the 1971 reinterment of Chief Taoyateduta/Little Crow, who was a leader of the Mdewakanton Dakota in the 1850s and during the Dakota War of 1862.
