= Stephen Return Riggs =

American clergyman and linguist (1812–1883)

The Reverend Stephen Return Riggs
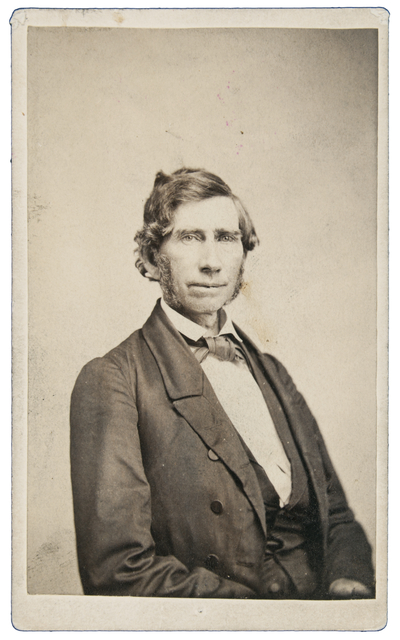
- Riggs c.1862 by Joel Emmons Whitney
- Church: Presbyterian Church in America

Orders
- Ordination: March 4, 1837

Personal details
- Born: March 23, 1812 Steubenville, Ohio, U.S.
- Died: August 24, 1883 (aged 71) Beloit, Wisconsin, U.S.
- Denomination: Presbyterian
- Occupation: Linguist and missionary
- Education: Washington & Jefferson College (1834 & LL.D. 1873); Western Theological Seminary (1873); Beloit College (D.D. 1873)

Stephen Return Riggs (March 23, 1812 – August 24, 1883) was a Christian missionary and linguist who lived and worked among the Dakota people.

Riggs was born in Steubenville, Ohio. His career among the Dakota began in 1837 at Lac qui Parle in what is now Minnesota, at the Lac qui Parle Mission. He worked among the Dakota Sioux for the remainder of his life, producing a grammar and dictionary and a Dakota translation of the New Testament He later worked with Thomas Smith Williamson on a full translation of the Bible.

In his autobiography Mary and I, or Forty Years with the Sioux, Riggs describes his life. In 1862, he served as interpreter at the trials of the Sioux Uprising. He died in Beloit, Wisconsin.

== Selected works ==
- 1852 A Grammar and Dictionary of the Dakota Language
- 1871 Dakota wowapi wakan kin. The New Testament, in the Dakota language
- 1879 Dakota Wowapi Wakan: The Holy Bible in the language of the Dakotas translated out of the original tongues
- 1880 Mary and I, or Forty Years with the Sioux

== Archival collections ==
The Presbyterian Historical Society in Philadelphia, Pennsylvania, has Stephen Return Riggs' papers, including detailed correspondence written by Stephen and Mary Riggs to their family members and two manuscript church histories written by Stephen Riggs. The correspondence also includes an occasional sketch of the missions they served.

== Family ==
Riggs's daughter Cornelia was the wife of journalist Julius A. Truesdell and mother of Major General Karl Truesdell.
