= Henry H. Cross =

American painter (1837–1918)

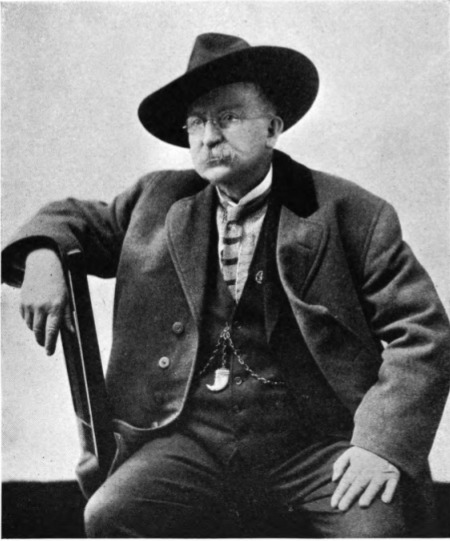
- Studio portrait of Cross
- Born: Henry Herman Cross; November 23, 1837; Flemingville, Tioga County, New York, U.S.
- Died: April 2, 1918 (aged 80); Chicago, Illinois, U.S.
- Resting place: Sulphur Creek Cemetery, French Lick, Indiana, U.S.
- Education: Rosa Bonheur
- Known for: Painting the American frontier and Indigenous people
- Style: Animalier; Western American Art
- Children: 1
- Patrons: Abraham Lincoln; Sitting Bull; Kalākaua; P.T. Barnum; T. B. Walker; Robert E. Bonner; Cornelius Vanderbilt; Buffalo Bill; George Armstrong Custer; Ulysses S. Grant

Henry Herman Cross (November 23, 1837 - April 2, 1918) was an American painter, hunter, prospector, and frontiersman. A personal friend of William Frederick "Buffalo Bill" Cody, Cross became famous for his many portraits and depictions of Indigenous Americans and life on the American frontier. Cross's works include portraits of western figures such as Jim Bridger, Amos Chapman, George Armstrong Custer, Sitting Bull, Geronimo, and John Grass. Bill Cody referred to Cross as "the greatest painter of Indian portraiture of all times".

== Early life ==
Henry Herman Cross was born on November 23, 1837 in the village of Flemingville in Tioga County, New York to parents John Cross and Sophronia B. Hewitt. Cross's brother was the regionally famous Indiana limestone stonemason and sculptor Ferdinand Cross of French Lick, Indiana. Much of Ferdindan's work was exhibited at the West Baden Springs Hotel.

In 1844 Cross and his family moved to Binghamton, New York where he studied at the Binghamton Academy. Displaying skills in art at a very young age, Cross eventually pursued a career in painting portraits. In 1852 Cross accepted a job working as an artist for a traveling carnival while living in St. Anthony, Minnesota before studying art while in France from 1853 to 1855. While in France Cross studied under Rosa Bonheur as an apprentice animalier.

== Career ==
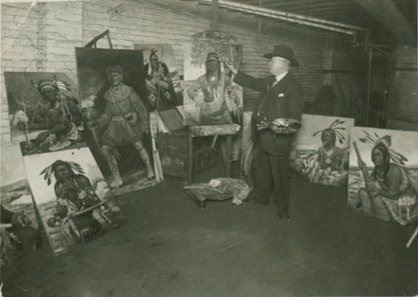
Cross with Indian portraits c.1920

Beginning in 1855 on Cross's return to the United States he began painting commissioned portraits while working for various circuses. In 1860 Cross's family moved to Chicago, Illinois. While in Illinois Cross developed an affinity and interest in painting many Indigenous American people, likely inspired by other Anglo-American artists of the time such as Paul Kane, George Catlin, Elbridge Ayer Burbank, Charles Bird King, Joseph Henry Sharp, and John Mix Stanley. Surviving examples of Cross's work on the subject include many prominent Indigenous people, primarily Plains Indians of the Midwestern United States including Thaóyate Dúta, Red Shirt, Chief White Eagle, Crow Foot, Arnold Short Bull, Naiche, Hook Nose, Victorio, and Chief Gall among others.

Cross eventually traveled much of the American West and Southwest living as a frontiersman and hunter. In 1862 while visiting Minnesota Cross painted portraits of the 38 Dakota men who were executed in the 1862 Mankato mass execution following the Dakota War of 1862 including both Shakopee III and Medicine Bottle who were later executed in 1865. While Cross's main focus in his artwork was Indigenous people, other areas of interest that Cross painted included animals, horse racing, harness racing, and western scenery.

According to the T.B. Walker Gallery, Cross was later commissioned by harness race owner Robert E. Bonner and business tycoon Cornelius Vanderbilt to paint their horses. During this time Cross also became well acquainted with P. T. Barnum and painted Barnum's wagons and advertisements for his circus and menagerie. While working for Barnum Cross is purported to have secured a wide variety of animals for Barnum's menagerie including Barnum's famous elephant Jumbo.

Cross eventually became acquainted with Buffalo Bill and other American military scouts and guides such as Amos Chapman, Jim Bridger, and Kit Carson who all later performed in Buffalo Bill's Wild West shows. Buffalo Bill eventually became a well known friend of Cross and commissioned a portrait from Cross. Cross and Bill continued a friendship well into their later years. Surviving letters from 1901 between Buffalo Bill and Cross are held by the Buffalo Bill Center of the West. During his time with Buffalo Bill, Cross eventually learned to speak the Sioux language and learned Plains Indian Sign Language which aided him heavily in painting various Indigenous people.

A few notable patrons of Cross's later career were Marcus Daly, Lucky Baldwin, King Edward VII, Ulysses S. Grant, King Kalākaua, Wild Bill Hickok, Brigham Young, and Joseph Jefferson among others. Cross's portraits were later featured in a gallery during the 1901 Minnesota State Fair. Near the end of his career Cross was approached by T. B. Walker of Minneapolis in order to secure upwards of 100 commissioned portraits of Indigenous people for Walker's personal collection of artwork. Cross died on April 2, 1918 in Chicago. He is buried in the Sulphur Creek Cemetery in French Lick, Indiana along with his brother. A catalogue of Cross's Indigenous portraits with descriptions was posthumously published by the Walker Art Center of Minneapolis in 1927 by the museum's curator R. H. Adams.

== Legacy ==
The largest number of Cross's portraits are currently held by the Gilcrease Museum and the Buffalo Bill Center of the West. Other works by Cross are held by a variety of institutions including the Minneapolis Institute of Art, the National Portrait Gallery, the Minnesota Historical Society, the Chicago History Museum, the Wisconsin Historical Society, and the Smithsonian American Art Museum. Cross Cave in French Lick in Orange County, Indiana was named in honor of Cross and his brother.

== Gallery ==
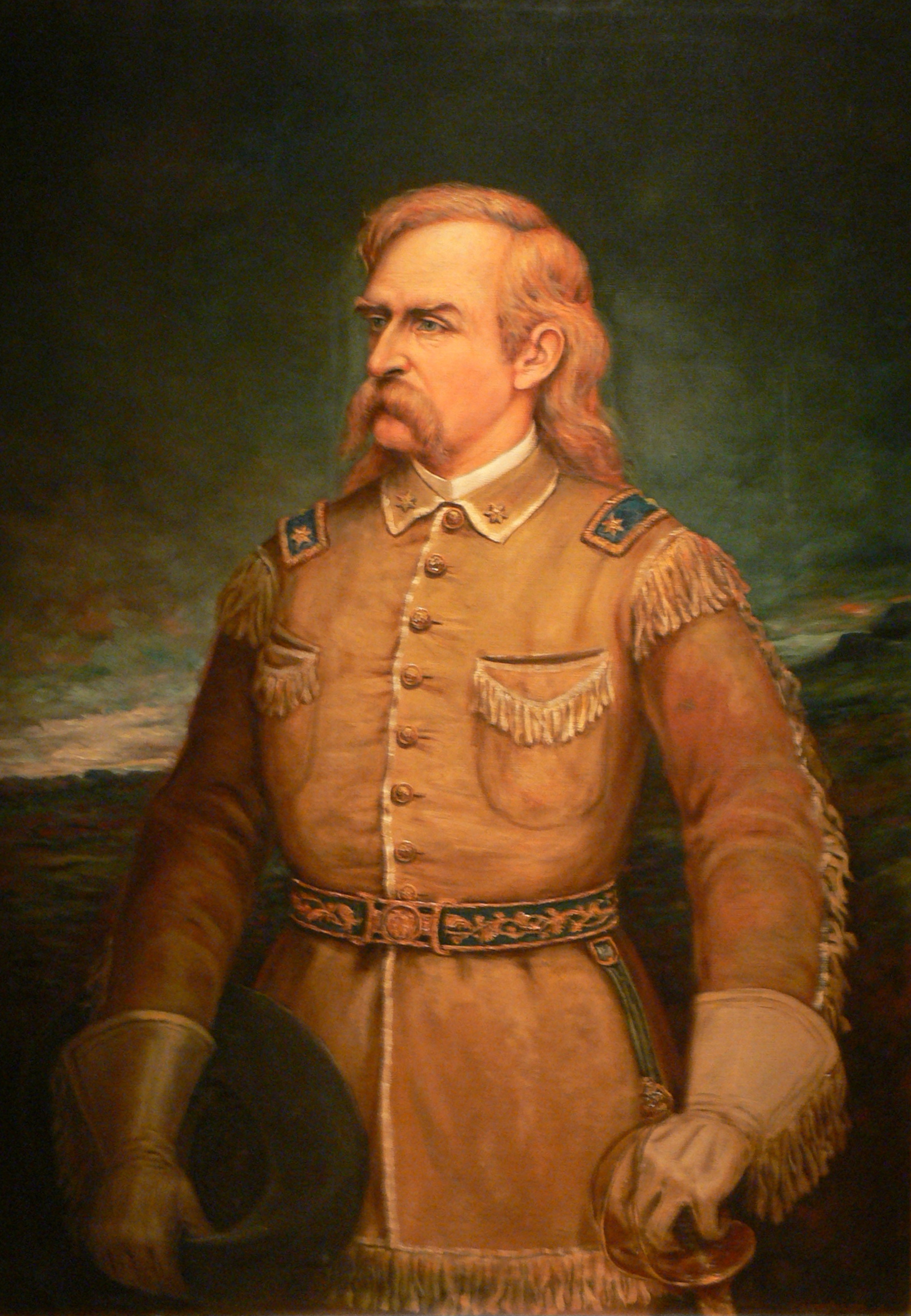
George Armstrong Custer (1874)

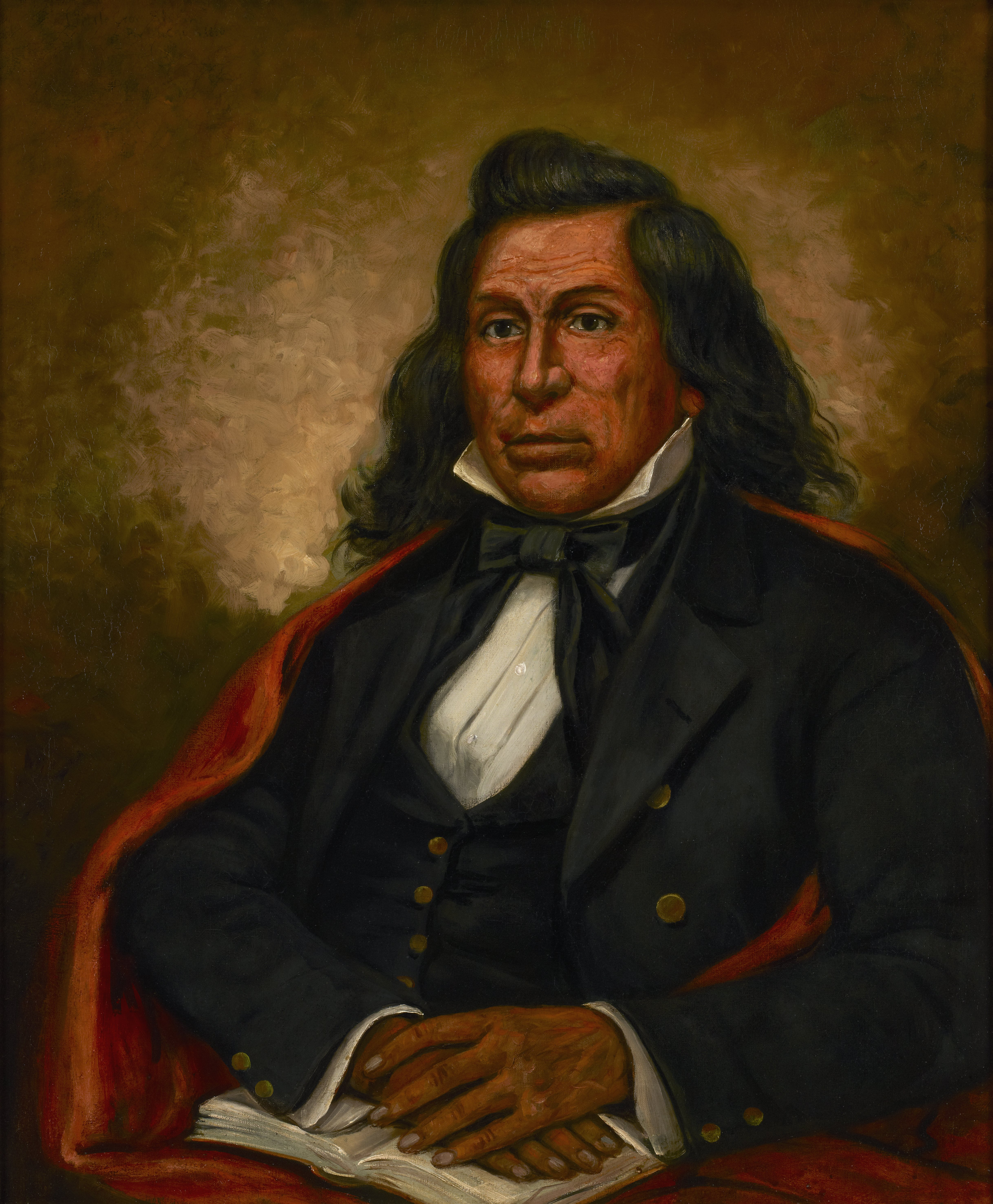
Little Crow (1863)

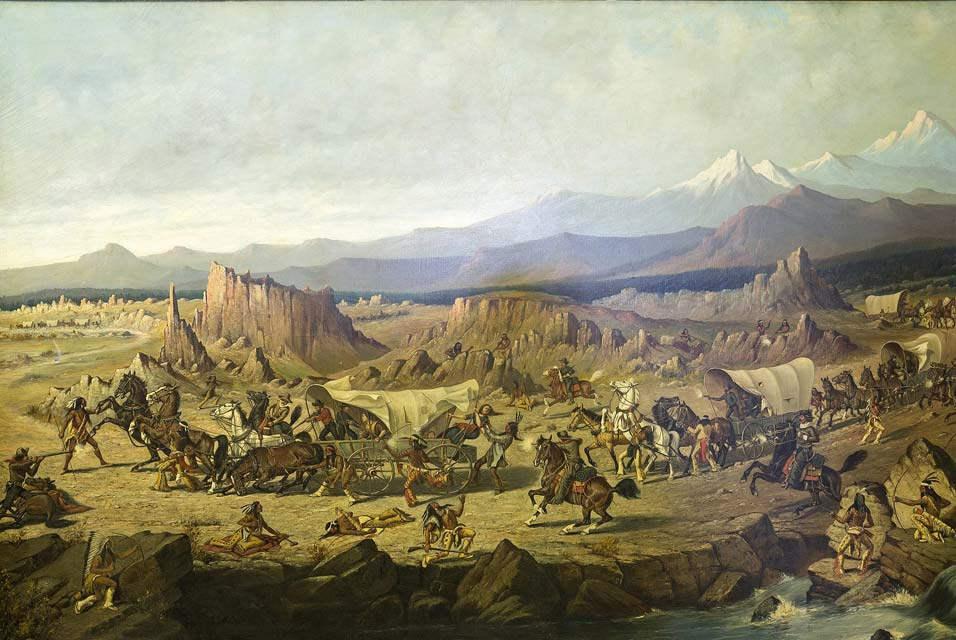
Baldwin Wagon Train under Attack from Knott's Ghost Town (1898)

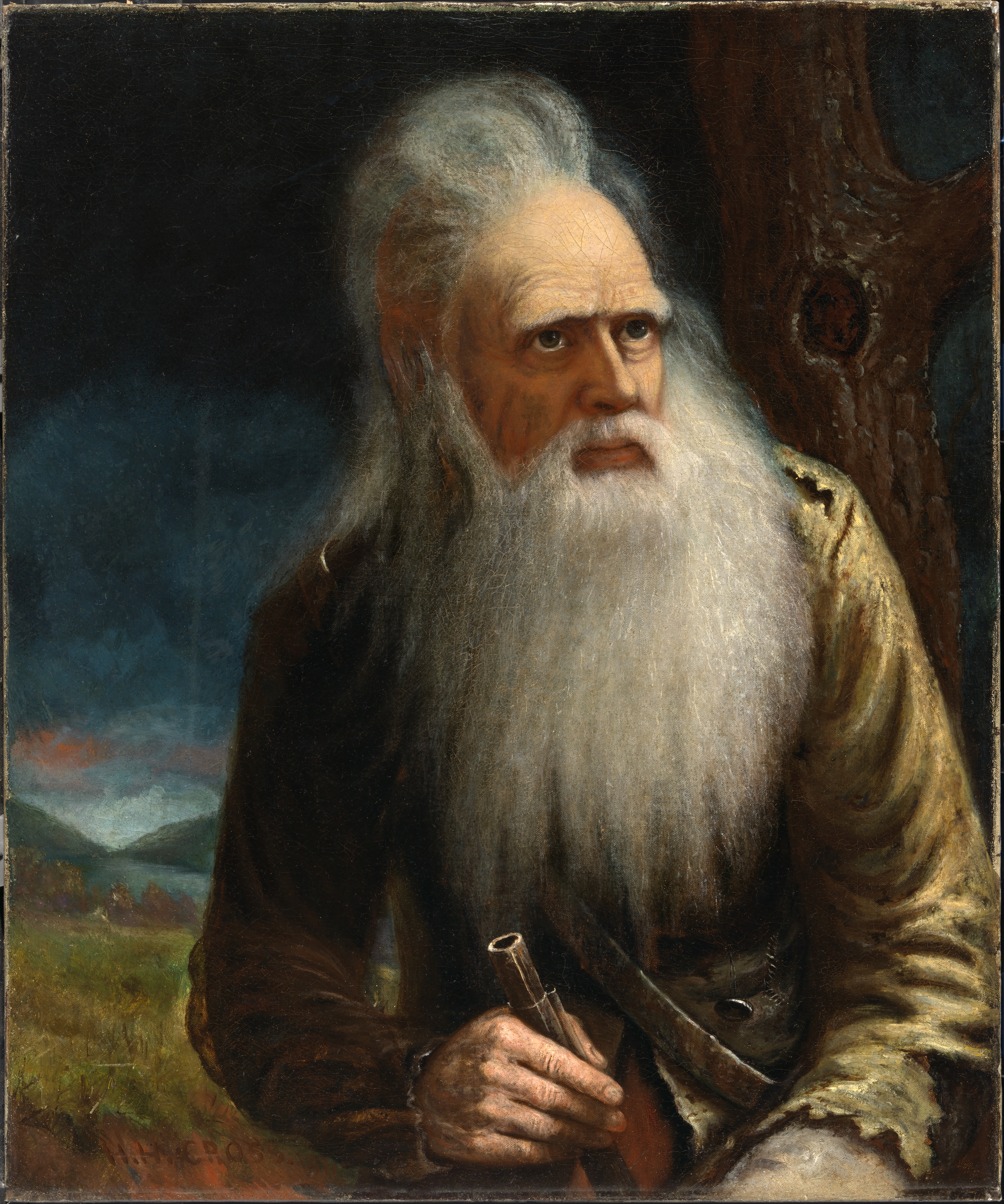
Joseph Jefferson as Rip Van Winkle (1871)

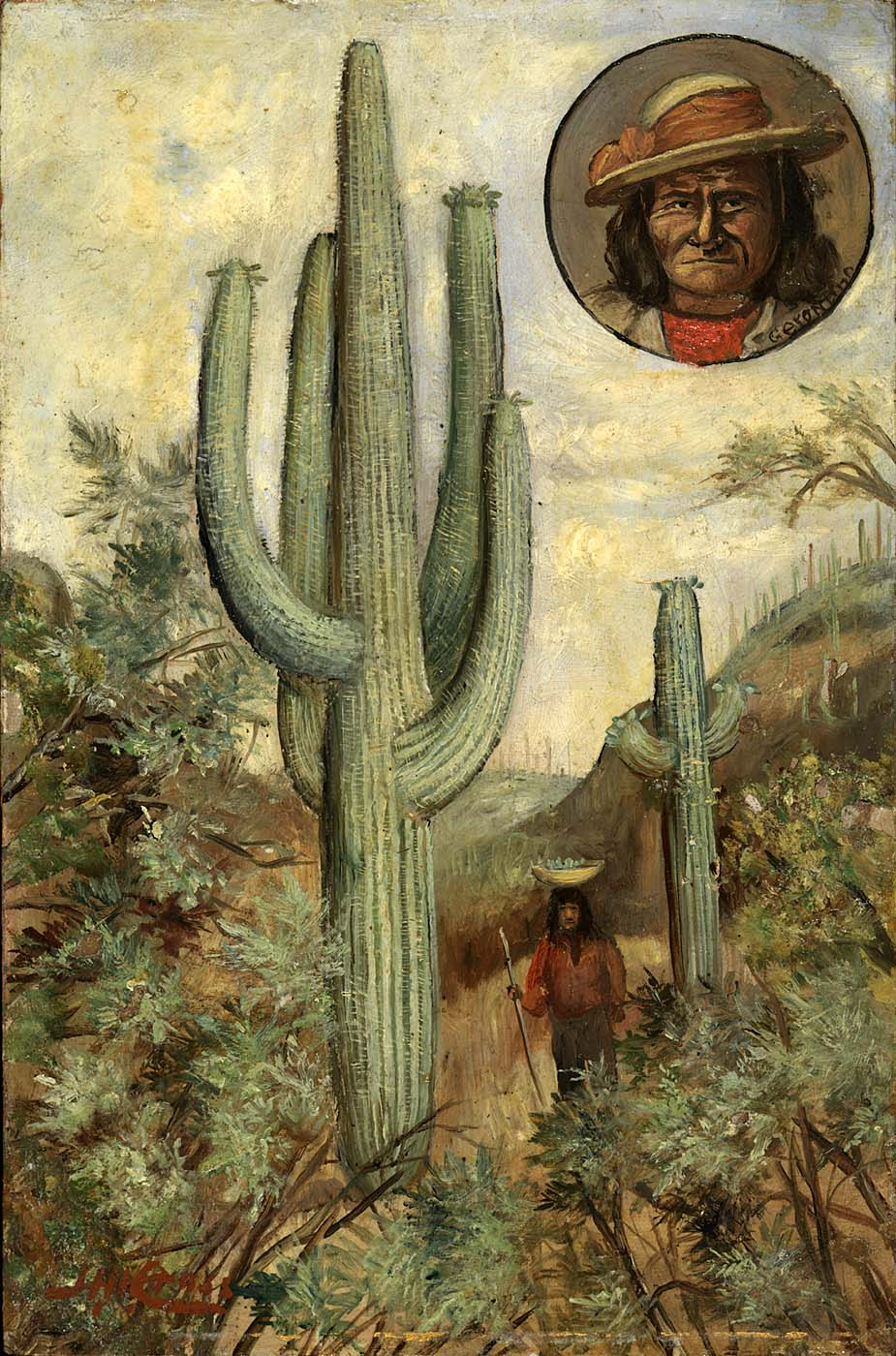
Cactus Landscape with Portrait of Geronimo (c.1886-1909)

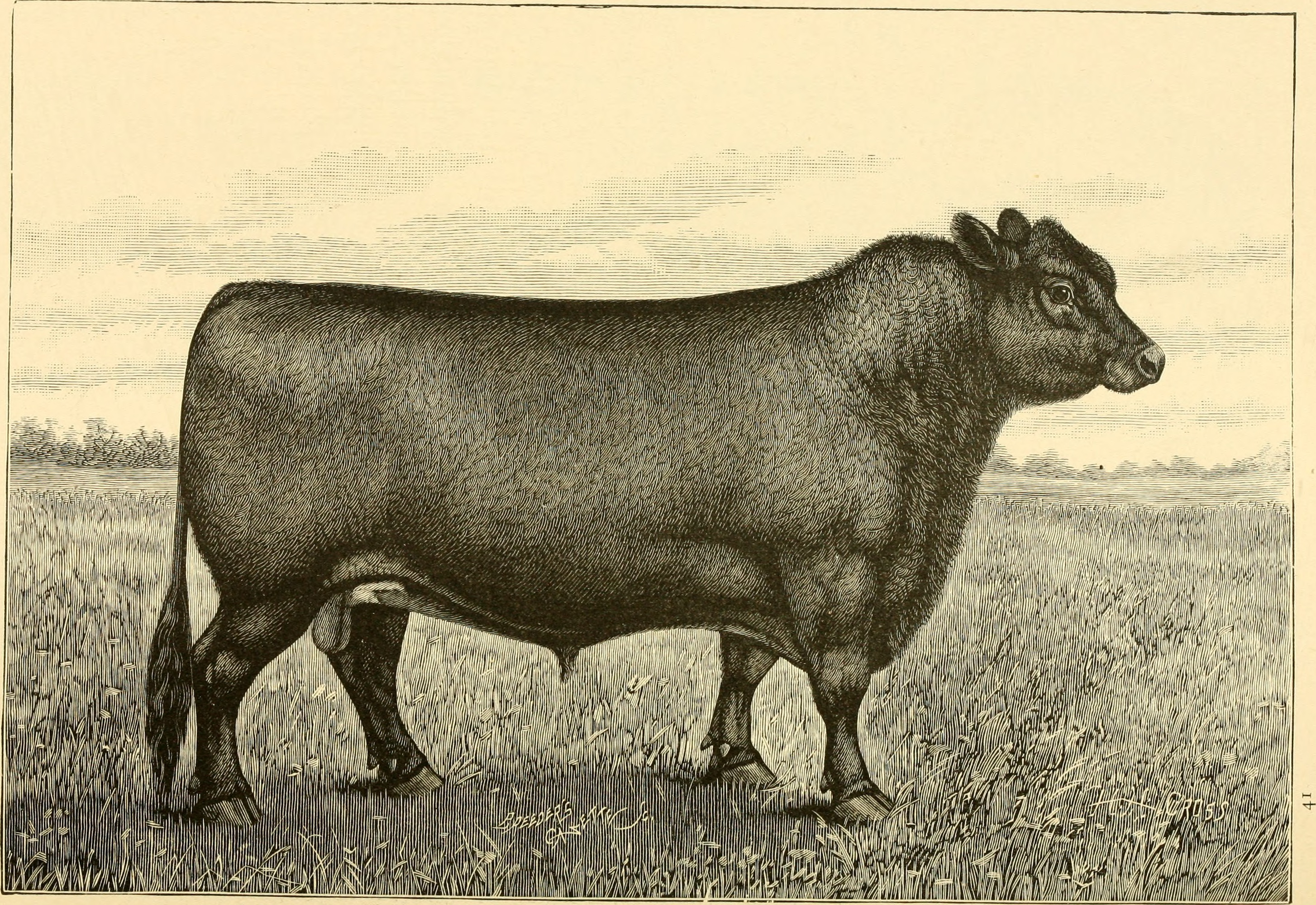
Aberdeen Angus bull Errant Knight, from the book "The breeds of livestock, and the principles of heredity" by James Harvey Sanders (1887)
