= Dakota language =

Siouan language of the Dakota people

Dakota
- Dakota Iapi, Dakhód'iapi, Dakȟótiyapi
- Pronunciation: [daˈkʰodʔiapi], [daˈqˣotijapi]
- Native to: United States, Canada
- Region: Primarily North Dakota and South Dakota, but also northern Nebraska, southern Minnesota; Northern Montana; southern Manitoba, southern Saskatchewan
- Ethnicity: Dakota; Santee; Sisseton; Yankton; Yanktonai
- Speakers: 3100 (2021): L1: ~100; L2: 3000
- Language family: Siouan-Catawban: Siouan; Mississippi Valley Siouan; Dakotan; Sioux; Dakota
- Dialects: Santee-Sisseton; Yankton-Yanktonai

Language codes
- ISO 639-2: dak
- ISO 639-3: dak
- Glottolog: dako1258
- Dakota is classified as Definitely Endangered by the UNESCO Atlas of the World's Languages in Danger.

Dakota
- People: Dakȟóta Oyáte
- Language: Dakȟótiyapi
- Country: Dakȟóta Makóce, Očhéthi Šakówiŋ

The Dakota language (Dakota: Dakhód'iapi or Dakȟótiyapi), also referred to as Dakhóta, is a Siouan language spoken by the Dakota people of the Očhéthi Šakówiŋ, commonly known in English as the Sioux. Dakota is closely related to and mutually intelligible with the Lakota language.

== Morphology ==
=== Nouns ===
Dakota, similar to many Native American languages, is a mainly polysynthetic language, meaning that different morphemes in the form of affixes can be combined to form a single word. Nouns in Dakota can be broken down into two classes, primitive and derivative. Primitive nouns are nouns whose origin cannot be deduced from any other word (for example makhá or earth, phéta or fire, and até or father), while derivative nouns are nouns that are formed in various ways from words of other grammatical categories. Primitive nouns stand on their own and are separate from other words. Derivative nouns, on the other hand, are formed by the addition of affixes to words in other grammatical categories.

=== Verbs ===
Verbs in Dakota can appropriate, through agglutination and synthesis, many of the pronominal, prepositional, and adverbial or modal affixes of the language. There are many verbal roots, all of which are only used once certain causative prefixes are added, forming participles. Like Spanish or French, Dakota verbs also have three persons, the first, the second, and the third. Person is indicated through the presence (first and second person) or lack (third person) of personal pronoun affixes. There are two forms of tense in the language, the aorist (as verbs, adjectives, and other nouns, sometimes called the indefinite) and the future. In order to express the future tense, the suffixes kta or kte are placed after the verb, much in contrast to expressing the aorist tense, which requires no marking, but is instead derived from the context of what is being said.

==== Verb types ====
Abstract benefactive; (wa- + -kíči-) An action that is for someone else's benefit and is further generalized as a concept.

- Wíkičihni "to hunt or hustle for someone (on their behalf)"

Abstract causative; (wa- + -yA) An action that causes something to change state or action and is generalized as a concept.

- WapíȟyA "to boil things"

Abstract intransitive; (wa-) Does not specify an object and is further generalized as a concept.

- WakáǧA "to make things, create"

Abstract possessive; (wa- + -ki; & wa- + hd-) Specifies that the action is upon one’s own, and is further generalized as a concept.

- Wíkihni "to hunt or hustle for one’s self or one’s family"
- Wahdúžaža "to wash one’s own things"

Abstract transitive; (wa-) Requires an object, and is further generalized as a concept.

- Awámanuŋ "to steal from someone"
- WíwaŋǧA "to ask someone questions, interrogate or interview somebody"

Auxiliary; Follows an unconjugated verb and modifies it.

- Ší "to command someone, tell someone what to do (ex. waŋyág ší ’tell someone to look’)"

Benefactive; Dative 2; (-kíči-) An action that is for someone else’s benefit or on their behalf.

- KíčičaǧA "to make something (specified) in someone’s place"

Causative; (-ye, -ya & -yaŋ) An action that causes something or someone to change state or action.

- PiȟyÁ "to boil something (specified); to cause something to boil"

Dative 1; (-ki- & -khi-) An action that indicates an object or recipient.

- KiyútA "to eat someone else’s"
- DudkhíyA "to dye or paint someone else's red"

Ditransitive; An action that requires two objects, whether the actor and another or two items.

- Amánuŋ "to steal something (specified) from someone"

Intransitive; An action that doesn’t need an object.

- InáȟmA / InáȟbA "to be hiding"

Possessive; (-ki-, & -hd-) An action that targets one's own.

- NakíȟmA / NakíȟbA "to hide one’s own"

Reciprocal; (-kičhi- ± -pi) An action between two parties that is done in kind to one another.

- Ókičhiyapi "to help one another"

Reflexive; (-ič’i- & -ihd-) An action done to or for one's self.

- Óič’iyA "to help one’s self"

Stative; A verb describing a state of being.

- Tháŋka "to be large, great in size or renown; to be a grown up"

Transitive; An action that requires an object or subject.

- Yutháŋka "to make something bigger, enlarge, expand"

=== Affixes ===
In the Dakota language, affixes are used to change the meaning of words by attaching to the root word. Affixes can be added to both nouns and verbs, and they come in the form of prefixes and suffixes.

Prefixes are added to the beginning of a word, infixes inside of the word, and suffixes are added to the end of a word. For example, the verb wóyakA means "to tell a story" in Dakota. By adding the infixed "-ki-", the word becomes wókiyakA, which means "to tell someone". On the other hand, by adding the suffix "-pi," the word becomes "wóyakapi", which can mean "a story, a narrative" or "they are all telling stories".

Dakota being an agglutinative language means that affixes are added to the root word without changing the form of the root word. This can result in long, complex words that can convey a lot of information in a single word. For example, the Dakota word akáȟpekičičhiyA, means "to cover up something for one; to pass by a matter, forgive, or cancel". This word is made up of the root word kaȟpÁ (meaning "to cover, knock down or take something down"), the suffix -kičičhiyA meaning "to or for, (causative)", and the prefix a- meaning "upon" AkáȟpA + -kiči + -čhiyA = Akáȟpekičičhiye.

Overall, affixes in the Dakota language play an important role in creating new words and adding nuances to the meaning of existing words. They allow speakers to express complex ideas in a concise and efficient manner.

==== Infixoids ====
Infixoids are morphemes that can occur either as infixes, circumfixes, or transfixes depending on the word they are attached to. In the case of Dakota language, some affixes can function as both a prefix and an infix, depending on the specific instance of the word.

For example, the Dakota verb "dá" means "to ask for something". If you want to say "I ask for something from you", you add the affixes ki- to indicate dative 1 case (to someone), and čhi- 1s-2s (I to you) resulting in "čhičída". However, the verb eyÁ "to say something" uses the same affix in an infixed position, so if you want to say "she says to you", you would add the same affix ki- as an infix instead, with ni- 2sT resulting in "eníčiye" (ni- + ki- + eyÁ).

Similarly, the affix -uŋ- which can mean "you and I" (1d), and is shared with -uŋ-...-pi "we all, us all" (1p), can be found in both positions of prefix and infix, depending on the verb in use. The verb iyáyA "to leave or pass by" in 1s ibdábde (I leave), while in 1d uŋkíyaye (you and I leave). The same affix in the verb máni "to walk" is infixed as 1d maúŋni.

This phenomenon of affixes functioning as both prefixes and infixes in Dakota language is an example of the complex morphological structure of the language, and it requires careful attention to the specific context and meaning of the word being used.

===== Pronoun infixoids =====
- 1s -wa- "I"
- 1sT -ma- "I, (target/status)"
- 1s2T -čhi- "I to you"
- 1s3pT -wičhawa- "I to them all"
- 2s -ya- "you"
- 2T -ni- "you, (target/status)"
- 2s1sT -maya- "you to me"
- 2s3pT -wičhaya- "you to them all"
- 2s/p1pT -uŋya-...-pi "you/you all to us all"
- 1d -uŋ- "you and I; you and I, (target/status); 1p -uŋ-...+pi "we all (actors); us all, (target/status)"
- 1p2sT -uŋni- "we all to you"; 1p -uŋni-...+pi "we all to you all"
- 1d3pT -wičhuŋ- "you and I to them all"; 1p3pT -wičhuŋ-...+pi "we all to them all"
- 3T -wičha- "they all, plural collective (target/status)"

===== Grammatical infixoids =====
- Reflexive -ič’i- "to one's self"
  - 1s -mič’i-, 2s -nič’i-, 1d/p -uŋkíč’i-.../pi
- Dative 1 -ki-¹ & -khi- "to someone, or to theirs"
  - 1s -waki-, 2s -yaki-, 1d/p -uŋki-.../pi
  - 1s -wakhi-, 2s -yakhi-, 1d/p -uŋkhi-.../pi
- Possessive -ki-² "to one’s own"
  - 1s -waki-, 2s -yaki-, 1d/p -uŋki-.../pi
- Reciprocal -kičhi- "to each other"
  - 1s3s -wečhi-, 2p -yečhi-...-pi, 1d/p -uŋkičhi-.../pi, 3p -kičhi-...-pi
- Dative 2, Benefactive -kiči- "for someone else, on their behalf"
  - 1s -weči-, 2s -yeči-, 1d/p -uŋkiči-.../pi

==== Prefixes ====
===== Instrumental prefixes =====
- Ba- indicates a cutting motion, such as sawing or cutting with a knife or saw
  - 1s bawá-, 2s bayá-, 1d/p baúŋ-.../pi
- Bo- indicates impact by hitting or poking from a distance; 2. by impact via transportation; 3. by natural forces such as blowing wind, waves, lightning; 4. by blowing via mouth
  - 1s bowá-, 2s boyá-, 1d/p boúŋ-.../pi
- Ka- indicates an action done by striking or hitting with a tool, such as a hammer or an axe; 2. by natural forces such as wind or water, an outer force, (creates impersonal verbs that refer to natural elements); 3. can diminish adverbs to mean "somewhat, a little"
  - 1s waká-, 2s yaká-, 1d/p uŋká-.../pi
- Na- indicates an action of the foot or leg, such as kicking out, walking, standing; 2. of its own accord by an inside force, on its own, by itself; 3. automatically, such as by automation
  - 1s nawá-, 2s nayá-, 1d/p uŋná-.../pi
- Pa- indicates an action done by pushing away from the actor, by pressure with the body or with a tool
  - 1s wapá-, 2s yapá-, 1d/p uŋpá-.../pi
- Ya- indicates an action done by mouth, both literally and figuratively, such as yaȟtákA "biting," yawášte "blessing," yaónihaŋ "honoring
  - 1s bda-, 2s da-, 1d/p uŋyá-.../pi
- Yu- indicates an action done by hand, by pulling towards the actor or manually; 2. general causation; 3. indicates use of scissors
  - 1s bdu-, 2s du-, 1d/p uŋyú-.../pi

===== Possessive instrumental prefixes =====
- Hd- indicates the possessive form of ka-, ya-, & yu- verbs, such as hdakčá "to comb one's own hair", hdawášte "to bless one's own", and hduwášte "to improve one's own"
- Ihd- indicates the reflexive form of ka-, ya-, & yu- verbs, such as ihdáčho "to judge one's self", ihdúžaža "to wash one's self"
- Kp- indicates the possessive form of pa- verbs, such as kpahí "to pick one’s own", 'or kpažáža "to wash or clean one's own"
- Ikp- indicates the reflexive form of pa- verbs, such as ikpáȟica "to wake oneself up", or ikpázo "to show oneself off"

Locatives

- A- on, upon, over; 2. for a purpose; 3. in addition to
- E- to, at; denotes that the action is done at a place; of some verbs starting with "i," it makes a collective plural form: as, inážiŋ, "to stand", énažiŋ, "they all stand"; iyáyA, "to be gone", éyayA, "they all have gone"
- I- in regards to, on account of, because of; by, with a tool, changes active verbs into a tool object; makes ordinal numbers of cardinal numbers; prefixed to time nouns it means the following one
- O- in, into, inside; around, abouts, in a certain area; creates certain kinds of nouns; generalizes certain words

Abstract and indefinite object markers

- Wa- the main indefinite object marker; can create nouns from verbs, give verbs a more general or abstract meaning such as "people" or "things."
  - Wi- When Wa- comes before the vowel "i" it becomes wi- and forms instrument nouns; also the classifier for human women and terms related to the thípi.
  - Wo- When Wa- comes before the vowel "o" it becomes wó and creates abstract notions such as wóinina "the virtue of stillness"; also when the prefix wa- contracts with the prefix yu- such as wóžaža "to do laundry," (wa- + yužáža).

==== Suffixes ====
- -yA, -yAŋ causative suffix
  - 1s -waye, 2s -yaye, 1p -uŋyapi/uŋyaŋpi
    - -khiyA, khiyAŋ dative 1 causative
    - -kiyA, kiyAŋ possessive causative
- -pi plural suffix, can often make verbs into nouns equivalent to -ing in English
  - 1p -uŋ-...-pi, 2p -ya-...-pi, 3p ...-pi

===== Enclitic suffixes =====
- -phiča to be possible, good for, to be doable, feasible
- -daŋ, -da, -na diminutive suffix, makes nouns small or beloved
  - 3p -pidaŋ, -pida, -pina; such as hokšípidaŋ "little boys"
- -ȟčA, -ȟ very much, really, particularly; such as nínaȟče "very much so, it really is..."
- šni negative suffix, negates any verb it follows, such as wašté šni "not good"

==== Duplifixes ====
A duplifix is a morpheme that is a morphological process in which the root or part of a word (or even the whole word) is repeated exactly or with a slight change. Unlike other types of affixes, duplifixes can emphasize or intensify the meaning of the word rather than change its grammatical function, or can be used to indicate plurality or repetition, or to modify adjectives or verbs for emphasis. This is commonly called reduplication. Examples are as such; waštéšte "good things", p’op’ó "it is very foggy", and šigšíčA "bad things, ugly things"

=== Possessive pronouns and pronominal affixes ===
In order to show possession in Dakota, a possessive pronoun may be prefixed whichever noun is being possessed. Two forms of possessive nouns occur, the natural class and the artificial or alienable class. Natural class pronouns express possession that cannot be alienated, and when prefixed to a noun, signifies the different parts of one's self. For example, the possessive natural article pronoun mi-, which means "my," can be added to nouns such as "eye," in miíšta, or "words," in mióie; for inalienable objects such as one's body or intellectual property, and in some cases for possessive form of relative terms such as "my little brother," misúŋ, or "my daughter," mičhúŋkši. (However most relative terms are in their base form possessive; or use the causative suffix -yA.) Meanwhile, artificial possessive pronouns are used to signify property and possessions that can be transferred or traded. For example, the artificial pronoun tha-, which may become thi-, and tho-, is equivalent to the verb tháwa, "his or hers," can be prefixed onto nouns such as "bow," in thinázipe, and "friend," in thakhódaku.

== Syntax ==
=== Nouns and verbs ===
Dakota is mainly a subject-object-verb (SOV) language, where nouns, whether they are the subject or object, always come before the verb. And when two nouns are used in the same clause, where one is the subject and the other is the object, the subject is most usually placed first. Verbs are also usually placed after adjectives that are used to qualify either the subject or the object and adverbs that qualify the verb. When additional words are used within a clause that are not either nouns or verbs, the nouns, both subject and object, are always placed at the beginning of the clause.

== Dialects ==
Dakota has two major dialects with two sub-dialects each:

1. Eastern Dakota (a.k.a. Santee-Sisseton or Dakhóta)
  - Santee (Isáŋyathi: Bdewákhaŋthuŋ, Waȟpékhute, Waȟpéthuŋ)
  - Sisseton (Sisíthuŋ)
2. Western Dakota (a.k.a. Yankton-Yanktonai or Dakȟóta/Dakhóta, and erroneously classified, for a very long time, as "Nakota")
  - Yankton (Iháŋktȟuŋ)
  - Lower Yanktonai (Húŋkpathi)
  - Upper Yanktonai (Wičhíyena)

The two dialects differ phonologically, grammatically, and to a large extent, also lexically. They are mutually intelligible to a high extent, although Western Dakota appears lexically closer to the Lakota language with which it has high mutual intelligibility.

== Writing systems ==
For a comparative table of the various writing systems conceived over time for the Dakota languages, cf. the specific section of the article Sioux language.

== Phonology ==
=== Vowels ===
Dakota has five oral vowels, /a e i o u/, and three nasal vowels, /ã ĩ ũ/.

		Front	Central	Back
Close	oral	i		u
Close	nasal	ĩ		ũ
Mid		e		o
Open	oral		a	
Open	nasal		ã	

=== Consonants ===
		Bilabial	Dental/ Alveolar	Post- alveolar	Velar	Uvular	Glottal
Nasals		m ⟨m⟩	n ⟨n⟩				
Plosive/ Affricate	tenuis	p ⟨p⟩	t ⟨t⟩	tʃ ⟨č⟩	k ⟨k⟩		ʔ ⟨ʼ⟩
Plosive/ Affricate	ejective	pʼ ⟨pʼ⟩	tʼ ⟨tʼ⟩	tʃʼ ⟨čʼ⟩	kʼ ⟨kʼ⟩		
Plosive/ Affricate	aspirated	pʰ ⟨ph⟩	tʰ ⟨th⟩	tʃʰ ⟨čh⟩	kʰ ⟨kh⟩		
Plosive/ Affricate	velar friction	(pˣ) ⟨pȟ⟩	(tˣ) ⟨tȟ⟩		(kˣ) ⟨kȟ⟩		
Plosive/ Affricate	voiced	b ⟨b⟩	d ⟨d⟩		ɡ ⟨g⟩		
Fricative	tenuis		s ⟨s⟩	ʃ ⟨š⟩		χ ⟨ȟ⟩	h ⟨h⟩
Fricative	ejective		sʼ ⟨sʼ⟩	ʃʼ ⟨šʼ⟩		χʼ ⟨ȟʼ⟩	
Fricative	voiced		z ⟨z⟩	ʒ ⟨ž⟩		ʁ ⟨ǧ⟩	
Approximant		w ⟨w⟩		j ⟨y⟩			

== Comparison of the dialects ==
=== Phonological differences ===
In respect to phonology, Eastern and Western Dakota differ particularly in consonant clusters. The table below gives the possible consonant clusters and shows the differences between the dialects:

Dakota consonant clusters
								Santee Sisseton	Yanktonai	Yankton
	m	b	ȟ	p	s	š	t	h/k/g		
m			ȟm		sm			hm	km	gm
n	mn		ȟn		sn	šn		hn	kn	gn
b			ȟb		sb	šb		hb	kb	gb
d		bd	ȟd		sd	šd		hd	kd	gd
p			ȟp		sp	šp		kp		
t			ȟt	pt	st	št		kt		
č			ȟč	pč	sč			kč		
k					sk	šk	tk			
s				ps				ks		
š				pš				kš		

The two dialects also differ in the diminutive suffix (-daŋ, -da in Santee, and -na in Yankton-Yanktonai and in Sisseton) and in a number of other phonetic issues that are harder to categorize. The following table gives examples of words that differ in their phonology.

Eastern Dakota		Western Dakota		gloss
Santee	Sisseton	Yanktonai	Yankton	
hokšídaŋ / hokšída	hokšína	hokšína		boy
nína		nína	nína / dína	very
hdÁ		kdÁ	gdÁ	to go back
hbéza		kbéza	gbéza	ridged
hnayÁŋ		knayÁŋ	gnayÁŋ	to deceive
hmúŋkA		kmúŋkA	gmúŋkA	to trap
ahdéškadaŋ	ahdéškana	akdéškana	agdéškana	lizard

=== Lexical differences ===
There are also numerous lexical differences between the two Dakota dialects as well as between the sub-dialects. Yankton-Yanktonai is in fact lexically closer to the Lakota language than it is to Santee-Sisseton. The following table gives some examples:

English gloss	Santee-Sisseton	Yankton-Yanktonai	Lakota	
English gloss	Santee-Sisseton	Yankton-Yanktonai	Northern Lakota	Southern Lakota
child	šičéča / wakháŋheža	wakȟáŋyeža	wakȟáŋyeža	
knee	hupháhu	čhaŋkpé	čhaŋkpé	
knife	isáŋ / mína	mína	míla	
kidneys	phakšíŋ	ažúŋtka	ažúŋtka	
hat	wapháha	wapȟóštaŋ	wapȟóštaŋ	
still	hináȟče	naháŋȟčiŋ	naháŋȟčiŋ	
man	wičhášta	wičháša	wičháša	
hungry	wótehda	dočhíŋ	ločhíŋ	
morning	haȟ'áŋna	híŋhaŋna	híŋhaŋna	híŋhaŋni
to shave	kasáŋ	kasáŋ	kasáŋ	glak'óǧa

=== Grammatical differences ===
Yankton-Yanktonai has the same three ablaut grades as Lakota (a, e, iŋ), while in Santee-Sisseton there are only two (a, e). This significantly impacts word forms, especially in fast speech and it is another reason why Yankton-Yanktonai has better mutual intelligibility with Lakota than with Santee-Sisseton.

Some examples:

English gloss	to go	I shall go	to go back	he/she/it will go back
santee-sisseton	yÁ	bdé kte	hdÁ	hdé kte
yankton-yanktonai	yÁ	mníŋ kte	kdÁ/gdÁ	kníŋ/gníŋ kte
lakota	yÁ	mníŋ kte	glÁ	gníŋ kte

There are other grammatical differences between the dialects.

== Revitalization efforts and resources ==
=== Academic and immersion programs ===
The University of Minnesota was the first American University to establish a Dakota language class in their American Indian studies department. In 1966 a small group petitioned the University's administration to "establish links between the University and Minnesota's eleven federally-recognized tribes to develop recruitment and retention efforts for American Indian students, and to create courses on issues of importance to American Indian communities". In 2022, University of Minnesota's American Indian Studies Department and the Dakota Language Program collaborated to develop the Dakota Language House Living Learning Community in hopes of it becoming a full-immersion Dakota program. It is an opportunity for students to live with others who are speaking, or learning to speak, Dakota. Dakota language instructor Šišóka Dúta (Sisithunwan-Wahpethunwan Dakhota) noted, "To speak the language is to literally breathe life into the language because you're using the air to speak language, and so, in a metaphorical but in the literal way. So by speaking the language, we're breathing life into it and that's actually a phrase in our language". The University's classes currently include classes on teaching Dakota, alongside Dakota Linguistics, for years one through four. In 2023, the University introduced a Dakota language major program.

In 1979, the Sisseton Wahpeton Oyate college was established. They maintain a Dakota studies program, with Dakota language specialist trainings. The college has a dictionary and other materials available on their website, created through grants at their Kaksiza Caŋhdeṡka Center. These books and materials are hand crafted with the hard work and dedication of elder speakers of the Lake Traverse reservation community, with regular weekly meetings to create curriculum or work with learners; President Azure at the time said, "Many of our graduates are now out in the community and k-12 schools teaching what they learned and how they learned it, and are continuing to succeed in language revitalization". They also have an online Dakota/English dictionary. The University of Minnesota and the Sisseton-Wahpeton Oyate College are working together to create the Dakota Language Audio Journal, which will be the first publicly available language journal, featuring recordings of conversations and stories.

In 2017, the Shakopee Mdewakanton Sioux Community funded a Dakota language training program called Voices of Our Ancestors, which provided four tribal communities with the resources to immerse 20 students in 40 hours a week of language. The tribal colleges which participated were Cankdeska Cikana Community College in North Dakota, Fort Peck Community College in Montana, the Nebraska Indian Community College Santee campus and the Sisseton Wahpeton College in South Dakota. The Fort Peck Culture Department create the Yanktonai Dakota Vocab Builder in the same year.

In 2018, the Lower Sioux Indian Community launched their Dakota immersion Head Start and also maintains online language classes to support the learning of their children and their families. The Dakota Wicohan program on Lower Sioux works with older youth to immerse them in the language and culture. Dakota Wicohan offers curriculum on Dakota values, language and customs through their website.

In North Dakota, there are state and tribal colleges teaching Dakota. The University of North Dakota has an Indigenous Language Education program up through a Bachelor of Science degree. Sitting Bull College, which serves the Standing Rock Indian Reservation maintains a dual Dakota/Lakota program, offering an Associate of Science degree in Dakhótiyapi. The Cankdeska Cikana Community College on the Spirit Lake reservation offers a Dakota Language Certification.

=== Curriculum, textbooks, and other materials ===
A Dakota-English Dictionary by Stephen Return Riggs is a historic resource for referencing dialect and historic documents. The accuracy of the work is disputed, as Riggs left provisions in the English copy untranslated in the Dakota version and sometimes revised the meaning of Dakota words to fit a Eurocentric viewpoint. Dakota Prisoner of War Letters is a great historic resource as it highlights fluently written Dakota language letters from the time of the Camp Kearney prison camp located in Davenport, Iowa, in 1863–1866. These letters are to relatives back home or to their closest representative they could find. It is the work of Dr. Clifford Canku as well as Michael Simon.

The Dakhóta Iápi Okhódakičhiye worked with Dakota language speakers, teachers, and linguists to create their Speak Dakota! textbooks, which are a fully illustrated series that is linguistically and pedagogically consistent. In 2023, the group released a free Dakota language app called, Dakhód Iápi Wičhóie Wówapi, containing more than 28,000 words and 40,000 audio files to aid in pronunciation.

Remember This! Dakota Decolonization and the Eli Taylor Narratives takes a unique approach to Indigenous history by centering Dakota language and oral tradition as crucial components of the decolonization framework. This is different from other works in the field, as it solely relies on Indigenous oral tradition as primary sources and gives prominence to Dakota language in the text.

Beginning Dakota - Tokaheya Dakota Iapi Kin by Nicolette Knudson, Jody Snow, and Clifford Canku is an online lesson portal by Minnesota Historical Society. Wíyouŋkihipi Productions has free learning resources for Dakota on their website that are centered around child and family learning, such as holidays and other activities like coloring books. Further, the director of Wíyouŋkihipi Productions has more resources on their personal artist site including Dakota land maps with audio pronunciations. Another mapping project called the Makxoche Washte: The Beautiful Country, is a Dakota and Lakota language map which is arguably the most extensive map in all of Dakota history and utilizes Google Maps.

In 2025, the Bible and Common Prayer Book Society of the Episcopal Church funded a Dakota-language hymnal for use in the Episcopal Diocese of South Dakota.

== Notable first-language speakers ==
- Carolyn Schommer (Waȟpéthuŋ Wiŋ) – Born in 1930, Schommer grew up in Granite Falls, Minnesota, alongside her 10 siblings. They were raised by parents who were both Dakota first-language speakers. Her grandfather was Íŋyaŋgmani Hokšída, Running Walker Boy, the son of Chief Running Walker, Íŋyaŋgmani. Her parents taught her only the Dakota language, which meant that she had to learn English and a new way of life when she started school at a white school. She is now (2023) 93 years old and is one of the few remaining first-language speakers in Minnesota. She taught at numerous schools including the University of Minnesota when it first established its Indian Studies department in 1969 and has worked on numerous publications throughout her lifetime.

== Bibliography ==
- DeMallie, Raymond J. (2001). Sioux until 1850. In R. J. DeMallie (Ed.), Handbook of North American Indians: Plains (Vol. 13, Part 2, pp. 718–760). W. C. Sturtevant (Gen. Ed.). Washington, D.C.: Smithsonian Institution. ISBN 0-16-050400-7.
- Parks, Douglas R.; & Rankin, Robert L. (2001). The Siouan languages. In Handbook of North American Indians: Plains (Vol. 13, Part 1, pp. 94–114). Washington, D.C.: Smithsonian Institution.
- de Reuse, Willem J. (1987). One hundred years of Lakota linguistics (1887–1987) Archived 2007-06-12 at the Wayback Machine. Kansas Working Papers in Linguistics, 12, 13–42.
- de Reuse, Willem J. (1990). A supplementary bibliography of Lakota languages and linguistics (1887–1990) Archived 2010-06-25 at the Wayback Machine. Kansas Working Papers in Linguistics, 15 (2), 146–165. (Studies in Native American languages 6).
- Rood, David S.; & Taylor, Allan R. (1996). Sketch of Lakhota, a Siouan language. In Handbook of North American Indians: Languages (Vol. 17, pp. 440–482). Washington DC: Smithsonian Institution.
- Parks, D.R.; DeMallie, R.J. (1992). "Sioux, Assiniboine, and Stoney Dialects: A Classification". Anthropological Linguistics. 34 (1–4): 233–255. JSTOR 30028376.
- Riggs, S.R., & Dorsey, J.O. (Ed.). (1973). Dakota grammar, texts, and ethnography. Minneapolis: Ross & Haines, Inc.
- Shaw, P.A. (1980). Theoretical issues in Dakota phonology and morphology. New York: Garland Publishing, Inc.
