= Thomas Smith Williamson =

American physician and missionary

- Born: March 8, 1800; Fairforest, South Carolina
- Died: June 24, 1879 (aged 79)
- Occupations: Physician; missionary

Thomas Smith Williamson (March 1800 – June 24, 1879) was an American medical doctor and missionary. He co-authored the first translation of the Bible into Sioux.

== Early life and education ==
Williamson, the only son of Rev. William and Mary (Smith) Williamson, was born at Fair Forest, Union District, South Carolina, on March 8, 1800; in 1805 his father, wishing to free the enslaved persons which he had inherited, moved to Manchester, Ohio.

He graduated from Jefferson College, Canonsburg, Pennsylvania, in 1820, and soon after began to read medicine with his brother-in-law, Dr. William Wilson, of West Union, Ohio. He also attended a course of medical lectures in Cincinnati, before attending the Yale Medical School, where he graduated in 1824. On receiving his degree he settled in Ripley, Ohio, where he soon gained a good practice, and was married, April 10, 1827, to Margaret Poage.

== Missionary career ==
A half-formed purpose to devote themselves to missionary work was rendered stronger by the early deaths of their first three children; and after spending one winter at Lane Theological Seminary, Cincinnati, and being licensed to preach the gospel, Dr. Williamson was appointed by the American Board in the spring of 1834 to visit the Native American peoples west of and near the Mississippi River and north of the State of Missouri. The result was the establishment by the Board of a new mission, of which Dr. Williamson was put in charge. As soon as navigation opened in the spring of 1835, he left Ohio with his family, and until 1846 was stationed at Lac qui Parle, among the Dakota, in the western part of what is now the State of Minnesota. In 1846 he removed to Kaposia, five miles below St. Paul, and after the cession of these lands to the government, followed the Dakota in 1852 to their reservation, and selected as his residence a spot some thirty miles south of Lac qui Parle. He continued there until the Dakota War of 1862, and afterwards made his home at St. Peter, Minnesota, where he died, June 24, 1879, in his 80th year. Margaret, his wife, died in July, 1872.

From the time of his entrance on the missionary work, he gave himself to the Christianization of the Dakota; he lived to see among them ten ordained ministers and about 800 church members, connected with the churches which he had planted. The crowning work of his life, the translation of the Bible into Sioux, was only completed, in connection with Rev. Stephen Return Riggs, about three months before his death.

His three surviving sons were all college graduates, and one of them, John, was associated with his father in the missionary work.
