= Pigs Eye Lake =

Lake in Minnesota, United States

- Location within Minnesota
- Location: Ramsey County, Minnesota
- Coordinates: 44°55′N 93°1.5′W
- Type: lake

Pigs Eye Lake is a riverine wetland that covers 628 acres in Ramsey County, in the U.S. state of Minnesota. The Mdewakanton Village of Kaposia was located on the northern end until 1837 when the village was moved across the Mississippi to what is now South St. Paul. The 1930 construction of lock and dam #2 in Hastings down river, is responsible for its size and depth. The wetland is part of what the Army Corps of Engineers has designated as pond 2 of the upper Mississippi waterway. It is south of downtown St. Paul on the east side of the river. Battle Creek enters the wetland from the northeast. In the 1960s the Army Corps of Engineers dredged two channels into it. One, out of the southwest corner, went due west out to the main river channel. The second went due south for barge traffic. Along that south channel the Army Corps created an industrial park with spoils from dredging the main channel. That portion of the industrial park has moorings for several barges at a time. In planning for the future the Army Corps built a levee defining the north side of the industrial park thereby creating an area for future dredging spoils.

Ramsey County Parks has requested that the County Commissioners approve the Army Corps of Engineers putting 400,000 cubic yards of river dredgings into the wetland to create islands.

Pigs Eye Lake was named after Pierre "Pig's Eye" Parrant, an early pioneer who was the first official resident of the city of Saint Paul.

The 100 acres of Pigs eye island that separates the wetland from the main barge channel is home to a large Heron rookery. Prior to Army Corps depositing the dredging in the 60's the wetland's eastern side had large Yellow-headed blackbird and Red-winged blackbird populations that are now gone.

== See also ==
- List of lakes in Minnesota
