= William B. McGrorty =

American politician (1825–1865)

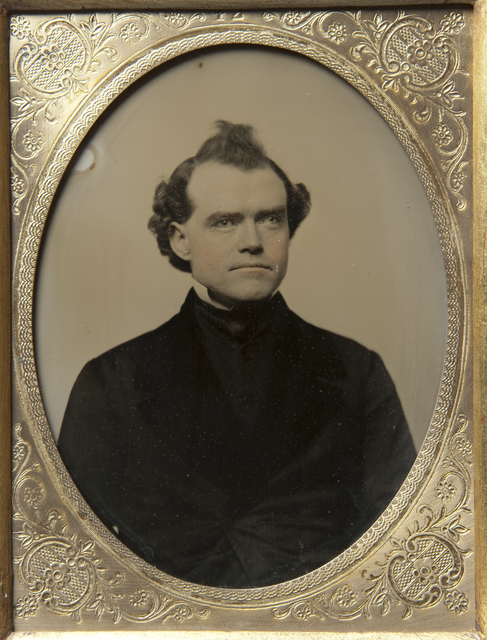
- McGrorty c.1858

Member of the Minnesota Legislature
- In office December 2, 1857 – December 6, 1859
- Governor: Samuel Medary; Charles L. Chase; Henry Hastings Sibley

Alderman of Saint Paul, Minnesota
- In office 1857–1858

Personal details
- Born: August 16, 1825 Inver, County Donegal, United Kingdom of Great Britain and Ireland
- Died: February 16, 1865 (aged 39) La Crosse, Wisconsin, U.S.
- Other political affiliations: Democrat

Military service
- Allegiance: United States of America
- Branch/service: Union Army
- Years of service: 1862–1864
- Rank: First Lieutenant (Quartermaster)
- Unit: 5th Minnesota Infantry Regiment
- Battles/wars: American Civil War; Dakota War of 1862

William Bernard McGrorty (August 16, 1825 in Inver, Ireland – February 16, 1865 in La Crosse, Wisconsin) was a member of the Minnesota House of Representatives and a veteran of the American Civil War and Dakota War of 1862.

== Career ==
McGrorty was a member of the Minnesota House of Representatives which was part of the larger Minnesota Legislature from 1857 to 1859, although the 1859 session was not held due to the protracted session of 1857 to 1858 during the 1st Minnesota Legislature. McGrorty was elected as the alderman for the second ward of Saint Paul, Minnesota in both 1857 and 1858.

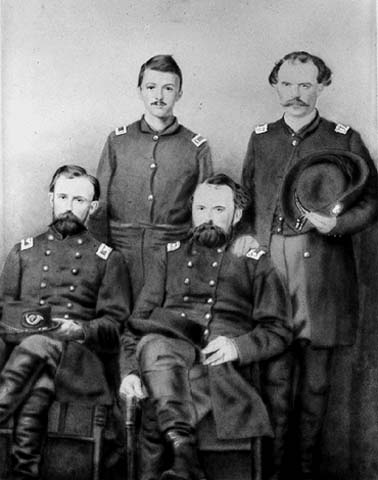
Photograph of Lucius Frederick Hubbard (front row, left) seated with Lt. Col. William B. Gere, Thomas P. Gere, William B. McGrorty; all members of the 5th Minnesota Regiment, taken after the Siege of Corinth

At the outbreak of the American Civil War McGrorty volunteered for service in the Union Army and was enrolled into the ranks of the 5th Minnesota Infantry Regiment on December 20, 1861 as the regiment's quartermaster. The 5th Minnesota later fought in the Dakota War of 1862 at the Battle of Redwood Ferry, the Battle of Fort Ridgely, and the Battle of Fort Abercrombie (Company D only). McGrorty served with the regiment for the majority of its duration of service from 1862 to 1864, McGrorty resigned from service on September 15, 1864. McGrorty died by accidentally drowning in the Mississippi River at La Crosse, Wisconsin on February 16, 1865.
