= William B. Gere =

American politician

William Beecher Gere
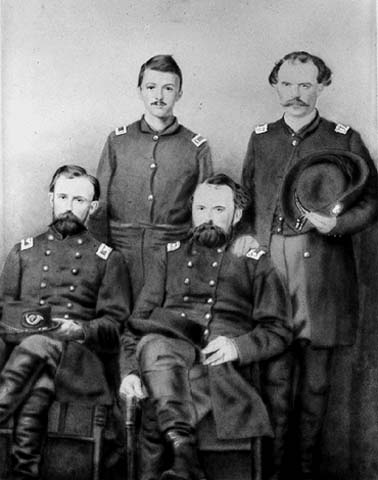
- Photograph of Lucius F. Hubbard (front row, left) seated with Lt. Col. William B. Gere, Thomas P. Gere, and William B. McGrorty; all members of the 5th Minnesota Infantry Regiment, taken after the Battle of Corinth.

Member of the Minnesota Legislature from the 8th district
- In office 1856-1857
- Governor: Willis A. Gorman

Member of the Alabama House of Representatives

Personal details
- Born: William Beecher Gere c.1830 Pennsylvania
- Died: February 4, 1921 (age 91) Bessemer, Alabama
- Party: Minnesota Democratic Party
- Other party: Minnesota Democratic Party
- Spouse: Augusta F. Marshall
- Relations: Thomas P. Gere (brother)
- Occupation: Farmer; Politician; Military Officer; United States Marshals Service
- Nickname: Beech

Military service
- Allegiance: United States; Minnesota
- Branch/service: Union Army
- Years of service: 1862-1865
- Rank: Brevet Colonel
- Unit: 5th Minnesota Infantry Regiment
- Commands: 5th Minnesota Infantry Regiment
- Battles/wars: American Civil War; Dakota War of 1862

William Beecher "Beech" Gere (c.1830 - February 4, 1921) was a farmer, American Civil War veteran, politician, United States Marshal, and early settler of Chatfield, Minnesota. After the war he lived in Sumter County, Alabama and served in the Alabama House of Representatives as a Democrat.

== Early life ==
According to the Minnesota Legislative Reference Library Gere was born in Pennsylvania in 1830. Gere moved to the Minnesota Territory in the early 1850s and settled in Chatfield, Minnesota. In 1853 Gere became part of the county government of Fillmore County, Minnesota. In 1856 Gere campaigned for a position in the 7th Minnesota Territorial Legislature representing the 8th Legislative District which included Fillmore, Houston, and Mower counties. Gere was reelected in 1857 and served in the 8th Minnesota Territorial Legislature. From May 20, 1858, until 1861 Gere served as a Marshal for the United States Marshals Service for the District of Minnesota.

== Military career ==
At the outbreak of the American Civil War Gere volunteered for service in the Union Army and enlisted as a Private on January 17, 1862. On March 2, 1862, Gere was given an Officer's commission as Captain in the ranks of the 5th Minnesota Infantry Regiment under the command of Colonel Lucius Frederick Hubbard. A Civil War era photo of Gere and others survives. Gere's younger brother Thomas P. Gere also served with him during the course of the war as his 1st Lieutenant in Company B. The Minnesota Historical Society has some of Gere's papers. The 5th Minnesota fought primarily in the Western theater of the American Civil War. Company B of the 5th Minnesota was originally posted on outpost duty at Fort Ridgely near the Upper Sioux Agency and the Lower Sioux Agency shortly before the outbreak of the Dakota War of 1862.

Company B moved to Fort Ridgley from March 22–25, 1862, and had garrison duty there till November, 1862. Companies "B" and "C" marched to Sioux Agency on the Yellow Medicine River on June 30 to July 2, 1862, to preserve order during annuity payment to Indians. During the Dakota War in August, 1862 Company B fought at the Battle of Redwood Ferry and the Battle of Fort Ridgely. Company B later marched for Fort Snelling on November 9, 1862, as an armed escort to the Dakota Prisoners of War. Gere and Company B eventually rejoined the rest of the 5th Minnesota Regiment near Oxford, Mississippi on December 12, 1862, and would fight the remainder of the war in the Western theater of the American Civil War. Gere was promoted to the rank of Lieutenant colonel of the 5th Minnesota on August 31, 1862, he was discharged from the Union Army on August 31, 1865, and was brevetted with the rank of Colonel.

== Later life ==
Following the war Gere moved to Sumter County, Alabama where he continued to work as a Democrat politician for the Alabama House of Representatives. Gere died on February 4, 1921, at the age of 91 in Bessemer, Alabama. Gere is buried at the Cedar Hill Cemetery in Bessemer. Gere was part of the Free and Accepted Masons.
