= Timothy Sheehan =

Timothy Sheehan may refer to:

- Timothy P. Sheehan (1909–2000), U.S. representative from Illinois
- Timothy J. Sheehan (1836–1913), Irish American immigrant, Minnesotan pioneer and military officer
