= Renville Rangers =

Minnesota militia which was used during the Dakota War of 1862

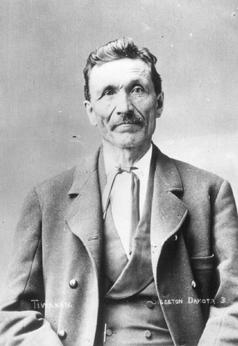
- Gabriel Renville, one of the militia's original commanders
- Active: 1862-1863
- Country: United States of America
- Allegiance: Union Army
- Type: Mounted Infantry Militia
- Nickname: "Tokadantee" (Prairie Dogs)
- Engagements: Dakota War of 1862: Battle of Fort Ridgely; Battle of Wood Lake

Commanders
- Akacita: Joseph Renville (Original leader)
- Akacita: Gabriel Renville (Successor)
- Captain: James Gorman

The Renville Rangers were a militia of Dakota and Métis in Minnesota who took part in the Dakota War of 1862, the American Civil War, and subsequent campaigns against the Dakota under Alfred Sully and Henry Hastings Sibley.

== History ==
The Renville Rangers initially consisted of between 15 and 25 Métis men, organized under the leadership of Joseph Renville in the early 1800's to protect his farmstead and the Lac qui Parle Mission in Chippewa County, Minnesota. According to Métis historian Lawrence J. Barkwell, the militia was also known by the nicknames "Renville’s Soldiers" or “Prairie Dogs" (Dakota: Tokadantee). Joseph Renville's nephew Gabriel Renville would eventually maintain the militia as its hereditary leader, an Akacita (Dakota: Warrior), and continue it well into the 1860's when it was utilized during the Dakota War of 1862 as scouts for the Union army and the Department of the Northwest.

== Involvement in the Dakota Uprising ==
On August 13, 1862 Gabriel Renville organized a group of Métis men and others who had been employed at both the Lower Sioux Agency and Upper Sioux Agency to form a company of volunteers known as the "Renville Rangers" to volunteer for service in the Union army for the ongoing American Civil War. This unit was eventually taken to Fort Snelling by Indian Agent Thomas J. Galbraith along with other volunteers from the Upper and Lower Reservations with an escort from the 5th Minnesota Infantry Regiment.

When the attack at the Lower Sioux Agency occurred troops of the 5th Minnesota Infantry Regiment stationed at Fort Ridgely were warned of the ongoing Dakota revolt. In response to this the commander at Fort Ridgely, Captain John S. Marsh, sent out a scouting party to the nearby Redwood Ferry on the Cottonwood River where the Battle of Redwood Ferry ensued. Captain Marsh had also ordered Lieutenant Sheehan and his detachment to return immediately to Fort Ridgely in order to protect the refugees who had now fled the Upper Sioux Agency and Lower Sioux Agency seeking protection at the fort. Likewise, Thomas J. Galbraith and the Renville Rangers were also recalled to return to the fort to protect it.

The Renville Rangers would ultimately take part in the Battle of Fort Ridgely with around 50 total militiamen under the command of 1st Lieutenant James Gorman, the brother of former Territorial Governor Willis A. Gorman. The militia would also take part in the decisive Battle of Wood Lake which ended the Dakota War.

== Later units ==
Some members of the Renville Rangers would later join existing Minnesota units when their 3 months of militia service expired by the end of 1862. According to the United States Adjutant General's Office, the "Renville Rangers" was the nickname for part of the 10th Minnesota Infantry Regiment. Judging by the official roster of the 10th Minnesota Infantry Regiment from the Minnesota Adjutant General's Office, Company I of the 10th Minnesota was partially made up of volunteers from Renville, Minnesota and the nearby city of Henderson, Minnesota. Company I was also commanded by the Renville Rangers original militia commander, Captain James Gorman.

== Casualties ==
- Private Joseph Fortier (Foertier) was wounded during the Battle of Fort Ridgely.
- Private Alexis Demair was accidentally wounded via friendly fire during the Battle of Wood Lake by a soldier of the 7th Minnesota Infantry Regiment.
- Private Joseph Paro was killed during the Battle of Wood Lake.

== Equipment ==
According to the book Recollections of the Sioux Massacre by Oscar Garrett Wall, during the Battle of Fort Ridgely the Renville Rangers were armed with "Harper's Ferry" muskets and only 3 rounds of ammunition per man.
