= Vincent P. Kennedy =

American politician (1824–1903)

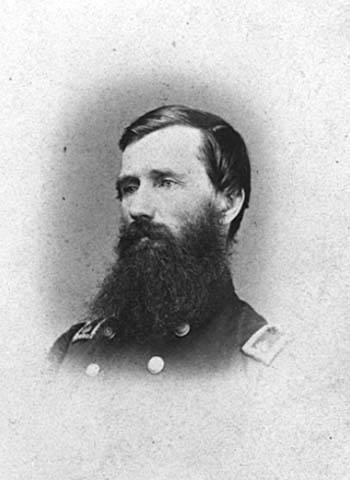
- Kennedy c. 1863 by Joel Emmons Whitney

Member of the Minnesota House of Representatives from the 6th District
- In office January 8, 1861 – January 5, 1863
- Governor: Alexander Ramsey

Member of the Dakota Territory Legislature
- In office January 13, 1885 – March 13, 1885
- Governor: Gilbert A. Pierce

Personal details
- Born: Vincent Pellett Kennedy; July 11, 1824 Butler County, Pennsylvania, U.S.
- Died: February 8, 1903 (aged 78) Litchfield, Minnesota, U.S.
- Resting place: Litchfield Cemetery, Litchfield, Minnesota, U.S.
- Other political affiliations: Republican
- Education: Indiana Asbury College (1849); Rush Medical College (1851); Bellevue Hospital Medical College (1875)

Military service
- Allegiance: United States of America
- Branch/service: Union Army
- Years of service: 1862–1865
- Rank: Major (Surgeon)
- Unit: 5th Minnesota Infantry Regiment
- Battles/wars: American Civil War; Dakota War of 1862

Vincent Pellett Kennedy (July 11, 1824 – February 3, 1903) was an American physician, soldier, politician, and prominent citizen of Litchfield, Minnesota. As a politician Kennedy served in both the Minnesota House of Representatives and the Dakota Territory Legislature. During the American Civil War and the Dakota War of 1862 Kennedy served as the assistant surgeon and later surgeon of the 5th Minnesota Infantry Regiment.

== Early life ==
Vincent Pellet Kennedy was born on July 11, 1824 in Butler County, Pennsylvania near Pittsburgh to parents Judge Martin Hugh Kennedy and Eleanor Pellett. At a young age Kennedy's family moved to Indiana and settled land in western Indiana near Brazil, Indiana. Kennedy graduated from Indiana Asbury College (now DePauw University) in Greencastle, Indiana in 1849 before moving to Rockville, Indiana to study medicine. Kennedy later received his medical degree from Rush Medical College in Chicago in 1851. Kennedy moved to Minnesota Territory in 1856 and lived in Greenleaf, Meeker County, Minnesota with his wife and family.

== Political career ==
Beginning in 1860 Kennedy was elected to serve in the Minnesota House of Representatives in both the 3rd Minnesota Legislature and the 4th Minnesota Legislature from 1861 to 1863 representing Minnesota's 6th congressional district. At the time Minnesota's 6th District included Carver County, Kandiyohi County, McLeod County, Meeker County, Monongalia County, and Wright County. During his time in the Minnesota House Kennedy served as the chairman of the Mines and Minerals Committee, the Public Lands committee, and the Towns and Counties committee from 1861 to 1862. Kennedy was later the chairman of the Engrossment committee, and served on both the State Prison committee and the Roads, Bridges and Navigable Streams committee from 1862 to 1863. Although a member of the Republican Party of Minnesota Kennedy sometimes identified politically as a Populist.

== Military service ==
At the outbreak of the American Civil War Kennedy volunteered for service in the Union Army on April 22, 1862 and was enrolled into the ranks of the 5th Minnesota Infantry Regiment as a surgeon's assistant with the rank of Second Lieutenant. Kennedy would eventually be promoted to the rank of regimental surgeon (equivalent to the rank of Major) on September 3, 1862 and served in Minnesota at the time of the Dakota War of 1862 at the Battle of Fort Ridgely. Kennedy would serve with the regiment for its entire tenure in the Union Army and would be discharged with the rest of the regiment on September 6, 1865 in Montgomery, Alabama.

== Later life ==
Following his military service Kennedy continued to practice medicine in Minnesota. Kennedy was appointed as the leading physician of the Ojibwe at the Red Lake Indian Reservation from November 1865 to March 1867. In 1867 Kennedy returned to Meeker County and operated a gristmill called the "Cedar Mill" until moving to Litchfield, Minnesota in 1869. In the winter of 1874 Kennedy began his post graduate medical work at Bellevue Hospital Medical College and graduated in 1875. In 1880 Kennedy moved to Brown County, South Dakota (then part of Dakota Territory) and practiced medicine in Ordway, South Dakota and Aberdeen, South Dakota. While in Brown County Kennedy was elected to the position of postmaster. Kennedy was later elected as a councilman in the Dakota Territory Legislature where he would serve from January to March 1885 before moving back to Minnesota in 1886.

== Personal life ==
Kennedy was married to Julia A. Rudisell on July 19, 1849 while studying at Rush Medical College in Chicago, together they had two children. Julia later died on July 13, 1854. Kennedy's second marriage was to Caroline Rudisell, the sister of his first wife, on July 2, 1860, together they had three children. Kennedy was heavily involved with the Grand Army of the Republic during the reconstruction era along with the Freemasons, Kennedy was also a member of the Minnesota Medical Association. Kennedy died in Litchfield, Minnesota on February 3, 1903 from Bright's disease at the age of 78 and is buried in the Litchfield Cemetery (also called the Ripley Cemetery).
