= Timothy J. Sheehan =

Irish American military officer

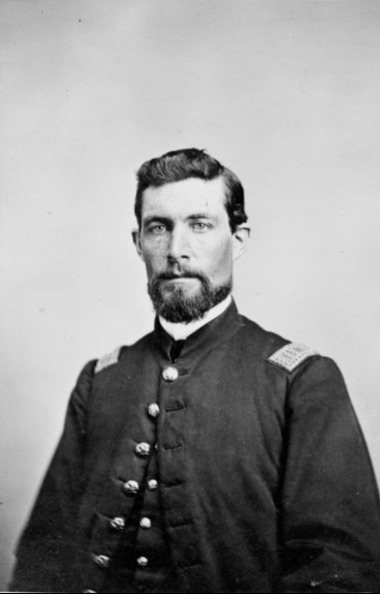
- Sheehan c. 1865
- Born: December 21, 1836; Republic of Ireland
- Died: July 11, 1913 (aged 76); Saint Paul, Minnesota, U.S.
- Burial place: Calvary Cemetery; Saint Paul, Minnesota, U.S.
- Military career
- Allegiance: United States of America
- Branch: Union Army
- Service years: 1862–1865
- Rank: Brevet Lieutenant Colonel
- Nicknames: "The Savior of Fort Ridgely"; "The Fighting Irishman"
- Units: 4th Minnesota Infantry Regiment; 5th Minnesota Infantry Regiment
- Commands: Company C, 5th Minnesota Infantry Regiment
- Known for: Battle of Fort Ridgely
- Conflicts: American Civil War; Dakota War of 1862

Timothy J. Sheehan (December 21, 1836 - July 11, 1913) was an Irish American immigrant, Minnesotan pioneer, a military officer during the American Civil War and Dakota War of 1862, Indian agent, Deputy US Marshal, the Sheriff of Freeborn County, Minnesota, and an early citizen of Albert Lea, Minnesota.

== Early life ==
Timothy J. Sheehan was born on December 21, 1836 in Cork, Ireland. Orphaned at the age of 2, much of Sheehan's childhood is relatively unknown except for the fact that he was just 14 years old when he emigrated to the United States in 1850. Sheehan first worked as a mechanic in Glens Falls, New York until 1855 before relocating to Dixon, Illinois and working in a sawmill. By 1857 Sheehan was an early settler of the village of Albert Lea, Minnesota and resided as a lodger at the home of the local Sheriff, George Simmons Ruble, and worked at Ruble's sawmill. Sheehan later owned his own plot which he used to build a farm.

== Military career ==
At the outbreak of the American Civil War 25 year-old Sheehan enlisted in into the ranks of the 4th Minnesota Infantry Regiment on October 11, 1861 and served as a Corporal in Company F under the command of Captain Asa W. White. Before Sheehan could even fight with the 4th Minnesota he was discharged on February 15, 1862 and was commissioned with the rank of First Lieutenant and transferred to the 5th Minnesota Infantry Regiment on February 19, 1862.

Sheehan served as the First Lieutenant of Company C in the 5th Minnesota Infantry Regiment under the command of Captain Francis Hall. While companies A, E, F, G, H, I, & K were all sent to the South and took part in the Siege of Corinth, companies B, C, & D had been held in reserve back in Minnesota for frontier duty at Fort Ripley, Fort Abercrombie, and Fort Ridgely.

=== Role in the Dakota Uprising ===
In June 1862 Sheehan and the rest of Company C were posted on frontier duty at Fort Ridgely near the Upper Sioux Agency, the Lower Sioux Agency and the city of New Ulm, Minnesota. On June 25, 1862 Sheehan and a detachment of 50 men from Company C and 51 men from Company B were detailed by post commander, Captain Johns S. Marsh, to protect Thomas J. Galbraith, the Indian agent in charge of annuity payments to the Dakota at the Lower Sioux Reservation.

According to Sheehan:

"On the 14th of July I estimated that there were 6,700 Indians camped near there ; they were in a starving condition, and were constantly prowling around, begging. Went with Lieut. Gere to talk with the agent about issuing provisions to the Indians. He said that he would soon count them and issue rations, and send them back to look after their crops, to stay until he could send for them to receive their pay".

Later on July 27, 1862 Sheehan was requested to take a small detachment of men to the headwaters of the Yellow Medicine River in search of Inkpaduta, a Wahpekute war chief who had previously been involved in the 1857 Spirit Lake Massacre with specific orders to "capture and bring them in, alive if possible". Sheehan's search for Inkpaduta was unsuccessful so the force returned to Fort Ridgely.

On August 4, 1862 in an act of self-preservation several starving Dakota had surrounded the Lower Sioux Agency warehouse and broken into the warehouse stores in order to gain access to the large amounts of flour within the building. The Dakota people, who had been removed from their tribal land due to several land cession treaties including the Treaty of Mendota and the Treaty of Traverse des Sioux among others, were living in impoverished conditions on the Upper Sioux Agency and the Lower Sioux Agency along the Minnesota River. Winter blizzards paired with a summer drought had led to a poor crop yield for many of the Dakota living on the reservations who had recently been introduced to subsistence farming. Lieutenant Sheehan and a detachment of 25 soldiers were sent to the agency in order to help quell the riot. Sheehan eventually gained permission from Thomas J. Galbraith to issue food to the Dakota, which Galbraith did so with some hesitation.

=== The Battle of Fort Ridgely ===
At the outbreak of the Dakota War of 1862 companies B, C, & D of the 5th Minnesota Infantry Regiment were the only immediate military force available to defend the Minnesota frontier from events such as the attacks at the Lower Sioux Agency, the Battles of New Ulm, and the Lake Shetek Massacre. Sheehan had been in charge of a detachment at the time tasked with escorting Indian agents to Fort Ripley in order to sign a treaty with the Ojibwe.

Captain John S. Marsh, the commander of Fort Ridgely, left Thomas P. Gere in charge of the fort in order to take a detachment of men to the nearby Cottonwood River to investigate the ongoing Dakota attacks. When the Battle of Redwood Ferry ensued Gere would eventually recall Sheehan back to Fort Ridgely in order to defend it from possible attacks by the Mdewakanton, Sisseton, Wahpeton, and Wahpekute under Little Crow.

Sheehan would eventually return to Fort Ridgely and would take command of the fort's 180-man garrison with 300 refugees and Lieutenant Gere as his second-in-command. In the ensuing Battle of Fort Ridgely Sheehan would become a famous name in Minnesota history and was nicknamed by some as the "Savior of Fort Ridgely".

=== The Battle of Birch Coulee ===
During the Battle of Birch Coulee Sheehan served in a support role as a messenger and assisted Colonel Samuel McPhail in providing reinforcements to the besieged troops during the battle. For his service and bravery at Fort Ridgely and Birch Coulee Sheehan was promoted to the rank of Captain of Company C on August 31, 1862.

=== Later Military Career ===
Following the Dakota War of 1862, Sheehan served as the Captain of Company C of the 5th Minnesota when it was sent south to join the rest of the 5th Minnesota Infantry Regiment in the Western theater of the American Civil War. From December 12, 1862 until September 6, 1865 Sheehan would serve as the company commander of Company C during the Siege of Vicksburg, the Battle of Nashville, the Battle of Spanish Fort, the Battle of Fort Blakeley, and the Battle of Tupelo. On September 1, 1865 Sheehan was promoted to the rank of Lieutenant Colonel, he mustered out of service with the rest of the regiment just five days later on September 6, 1865.

== Later life ==
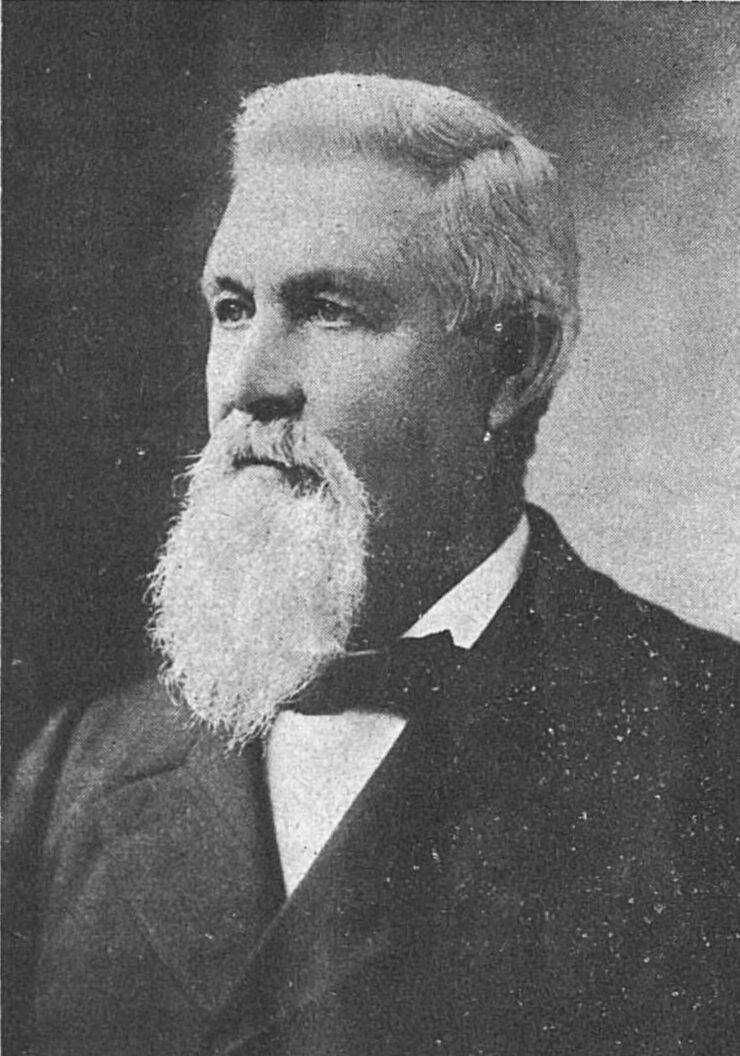
Timothy Sheehan in later life

Following the American Civil War Sheehan returned to Albert Lea, Minnesota and worked for the United States Marshals Service. Sheehan was appointed as Deputy Marshall by Augustus L. Armstrong, also of Albert Lea. Sheehan was later elected to the office of Sheriff for Freeborn County, Minnesota, and would serve as the County Sheriff from 1871-1883. Sheehan also later served as the Indian agent of the White Earth Indian Reservation from 1885-1889, and was the Deputy US Marshal of St. Paul from 1890-1907. Sheehan had also been involved in the signing of the Bishop Whipple Treaty of 1886 with the Ojibwe, as well as the Henry M. Rice Treaty of 1889 with the Ojibwe.

=== Indian Agent for the Pillager Ojibwe ===
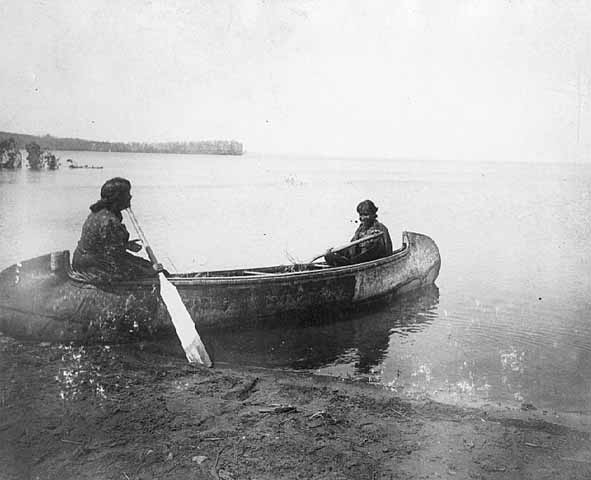
Ojibways in a canoe on Leech Lake, 1896.

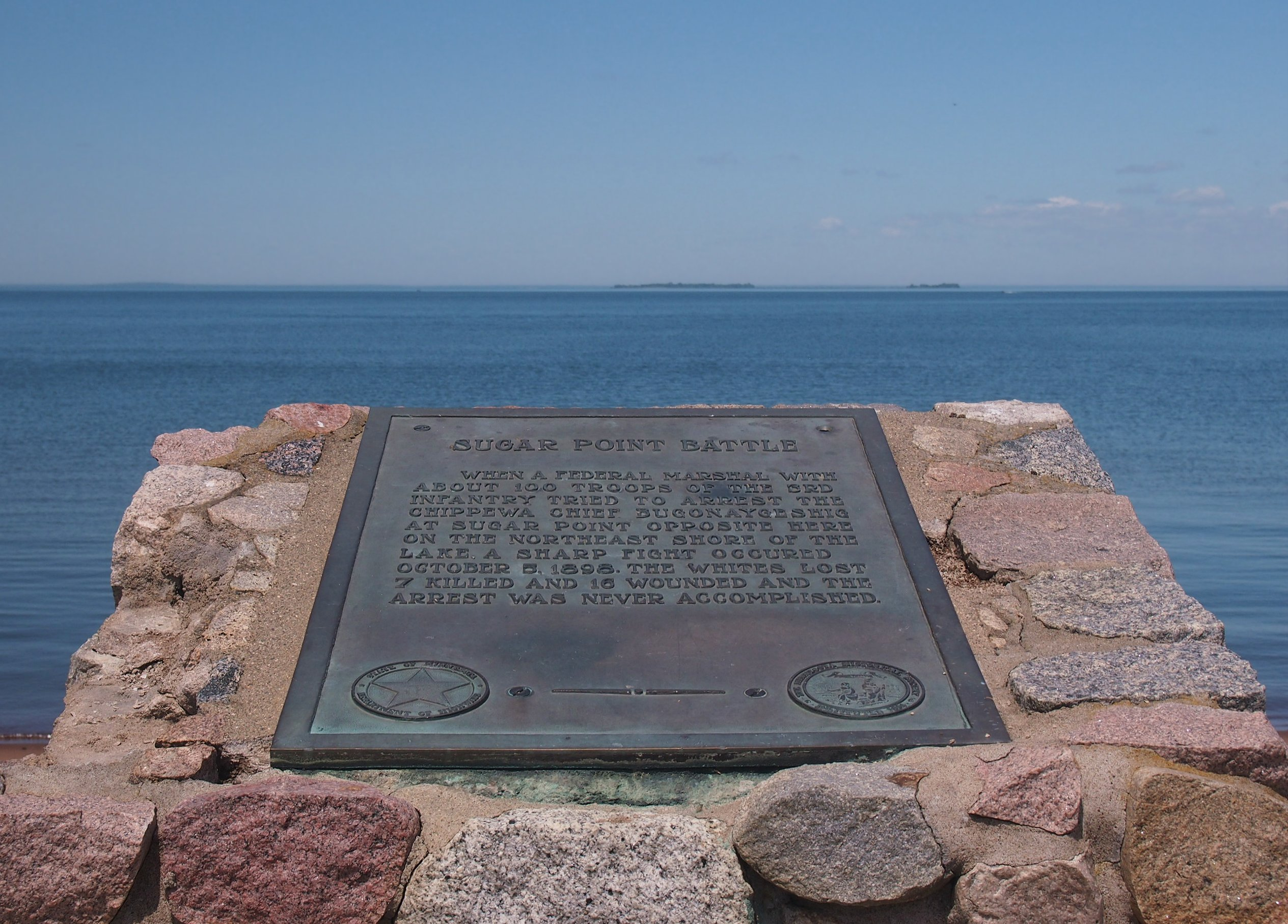
Battle of Sugar Point Historical Marker.

During his time as the Indian agent for the Ojibwe at the White Earth Indian Reservation. Sheehan would be shot and wounded during an altercation between forces of the 3rd Infantry Regiment and the Pillager Band of the Ojibwe (Ojibwe: Makandwewininiwag) during what would later be known as the Battle of Sugar Point.

Often cited as "the last Indian Uprising in the United States", the Battle of Sugar Point signaled the end of the so-called American Indian Wars and was arguably the last Indigenous uprising in the State of Minnesota since the Dakota War of 1862. One of the most cited reasons for the hostilities was that the timber being cut by loggers from the Leech Lake Indian Reservation was routinely being fraudulently graded as "dead and burnt wood" which, according to some sources, allowed the loggers to purchase the timber at a reduced price. This, paired with delayed annuities and the frequent arrests of Ojibwe men and women for supposed bootlegging on the otherwise 'dry' reservation, caused further resentment between the Pillager Ojibwe and the United States Government.

One man, Bugonaygeshig (Ojibwe: "Hole/Opening in the Sky/Day"), not to be confused with Hole in the Day (1825–1868), was a local leader and elder of the Pillager Ojibwe community. He had been arrested by Agency Police for bootlegging charges and brought to Duluth, Minnesota, however, due to lack of evidence he was freed and allowed to travel back 135 miles to the Leech Lake Indian Reservation on foot. Following his arrest Bugonaygeshig became increasingly agitated by the depredations of his people.

Bugonaygeshig was later called to be a witness for another bootlegging case in Duluth but failed to appear in court when summoned by a warrant from Sheehan, and the Deputy US Marshal of Walker, Minnesota, Robert Morrison. After failing to appear in court Bugonaygeshig along with Sha-Boon-Day-Shkong, another Pillager Ojibwe man were arrested in Walker by Deputy Marshal Robert Morrison and Indian Agent Arthur M. Tinker when the two Ojibwe men went to collect their annuity payments in Onigum, Minnesota. Noticing that there was a possibility of another trip to Duluth to appear in court, Bugonaygeshig called out for help. The other Ojibwe in Onigum, hearing elder Bugonaygeshig's pleas, surrounded, and gently, yet forcefully secured his release from the Marshal's office. Bugonaygeshig later escaped to Bear Island on Leech Lake and refused to surrender.

In response, on October 5, 1898 a detachment of 77 US soldiers of the 3rd Infantry Regiment were dispatched from Fort Snelling to Walker, and boarded two boats in order to apprehend Bugonaygeshig and several other Ojibwe men at Bear Island. On the boats were several U.S. marshals and deputy marshals, an army surgeon, four reporters, and 77-78 soldiers. The troops were commanded by Major Melville Wilkinson and Brigadier General John M. Bacon, the 3-hour skirmish which followed was nicknamed the Battle of Sugar Point. Although various accounts of the ensuing battle differ, according to General John M. Bacon's official report it is widely accepted that a soldier from the 3rd Infantry Regiment detachment neglected to engage the safety on his Springfield Model 1892–99 rifle, which caused an unintentional discharge when stacking arms. Fearing that they were under attack, the Ojibwe men on Sugar Point with no previous battle experience quickly returned fire at the soldiers killing and wounding several, including Major Melville Wilkinson who was shot twice, once in the stomach, and once in his femoral artery. Wilkinson died just a few hours later after the initial skirmish

=== Role in the Battle of Sugar Point and Wounding ===
During the ensuing chaos 62 year-old Sheehan, who was among the law enforcement and Indian agents at Sugar Point, assisted the 3rd Infantry Regiment in attacking the Pillager Ojibwe.

According to one source, The St. Paul Globe:

"Suddenly to our right we heard the voice of Col. Sheehan, of St. Paul, deputy United States marshal. We glanced up and could see the veteran Indian fighter, with his seventy years of age leading an advance by a portion of the right flank. 'You've got them whipped, boys; you've got them whipped. Give it to them, give it to them,' the colonel was yelling at the top of his voice".

During the battle Sheehan noticed that the 3rd Infantry was being flanked by the Ojibwe men on their right. Noticing this danger he led several of the troops in a counterattack. According to The St. Paul Globe:

"He was a few yards to the right of us and we could hear him quite plainly. Every time his voice was heard a volley rang out, and every time it was further away from us. Afterward we learned that we had the colonel to thank for our lives. Some Indians had turn our right flank and attack the civilians on the beach, the correspondents among the number. The colonel saw us in a moment and realized our danger, and his gallant attack had undoubtedly saved our lives - When we realized the position in which the colonel was in we called to him to get under cover for God's sake! But he paid no attention to us. He stayed with the men until he had accomplished his purpose, and when we had about made up our minds that he was dead we were startled by a move in the weeds above us. -'I've been wounded', was the remark we heard as the weeds parted and the gallant colonel fell to the ground before us. We did not know how badly he was hurt, but we saw at a glance that he had been shot in the arm for two holes were distinctly seen in his coat sleeve. 'That's not it,' he said, as we turned back his sleeve. 'It's my stomach, look at that,' - And we did so. We tore open his clothes and found only a small wound, but the blood was trickling down. The old man was not frightened by any means. - 'If you ever get out of here alive, boys, you will be in luck,' he remarked a few moments afterwards, as he lay on the beach".

After being wounded in the stomach Sheehan was evacuated from the Leech Lake Reservation along with several other law enforcement officials, military personnel, and newspaper correspondents. In total 7 people were killed, including 6 soldiers and 1 Indian agency policeman accidentally killed by friendly fire. Nineteen were wounded. One soldier, Oscar Burkard, a Hospital Steward, was awarded the Medal of Honor for his actions during the battle which included saving the lives of several men while under fire. Bukrhard was to be the last soldier to be awarded the medal during the Indian Wars.

== Personal life ==
Sheehan married an Irish American women, Jennie Judge (1844–1934), in November 1866. Together the two had three sons; Jeremiah Sheehan, George Washington Sheehan, and Edward Sheridan Sheehan.

== Death and legacy ==
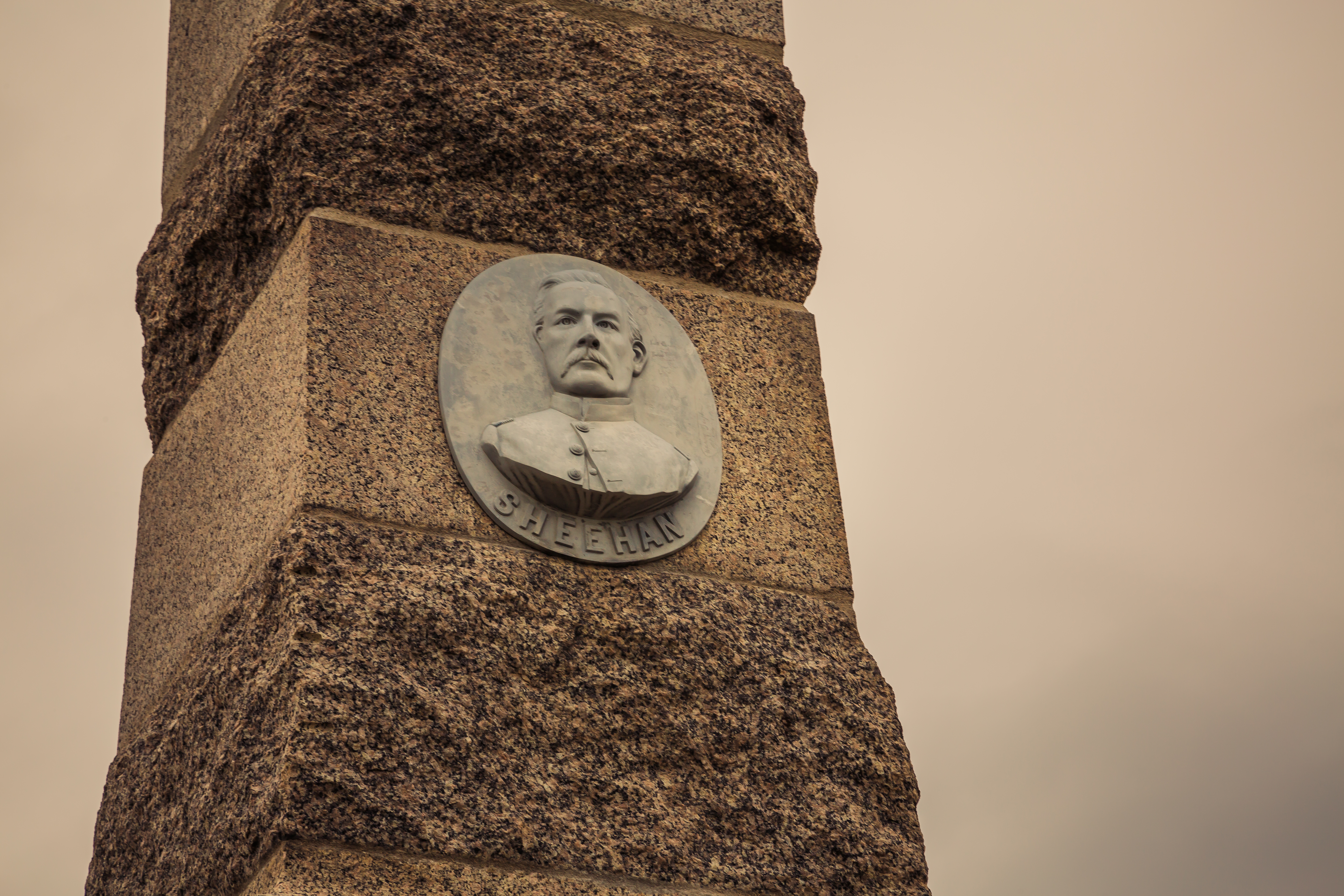
The face of Lieutenant Timothy J. Sheehan on the Fort Ridgely Monument at Fort Ridgely State Park near Fairfax, Minnesota.

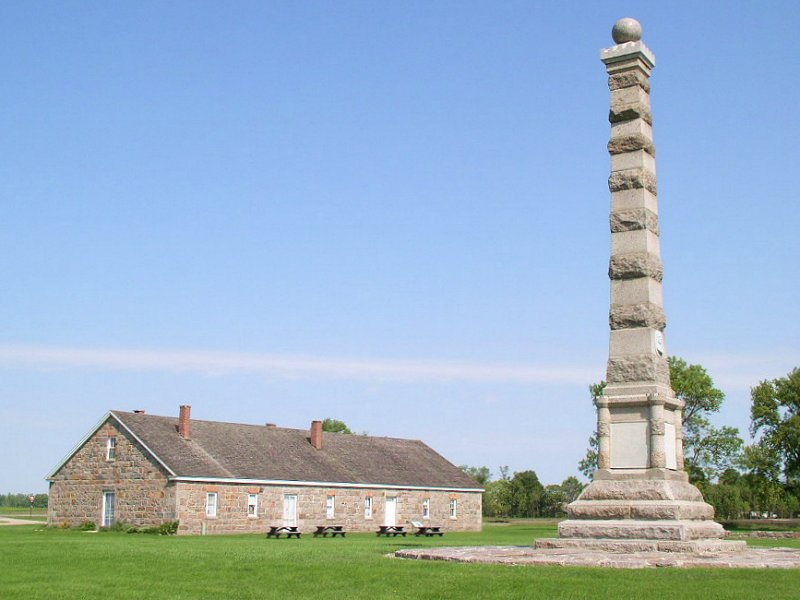
The Fort Defenders Monument at Fort Ridgely State Park.

Sheehan died on July 11, 1913 in Saint Paul, Minnesota several years after retiring from his position as Deputy US Marshal in St. Paul from 1890-1907. As Sheehan was an Irish Catholic he is buried in Calvary Cemetery along with his wife.

The Fort Ridgely State Monument also called the Fort Defenders Monument in Fairfax, Minnesota at Fort Ridgely State Park was dedicated on August 20, 1896 to honor Company C of the 5th Minnesota and the civilian defenders of the fort during the Dakota War. Sheehan's name is on the monument as well as a sculpture of his likeness on the monument's east facing. Sheehan and the Company C roster at Fort Ridgely is listed on the west facing of the monument. Various portraits of Sheehan are held by both the Minnesota Historical Society and the Minnesota Digital Library.
