= Fort Ripley (Minnesota fort) =

19th-century U.S. Army fort

- the United States
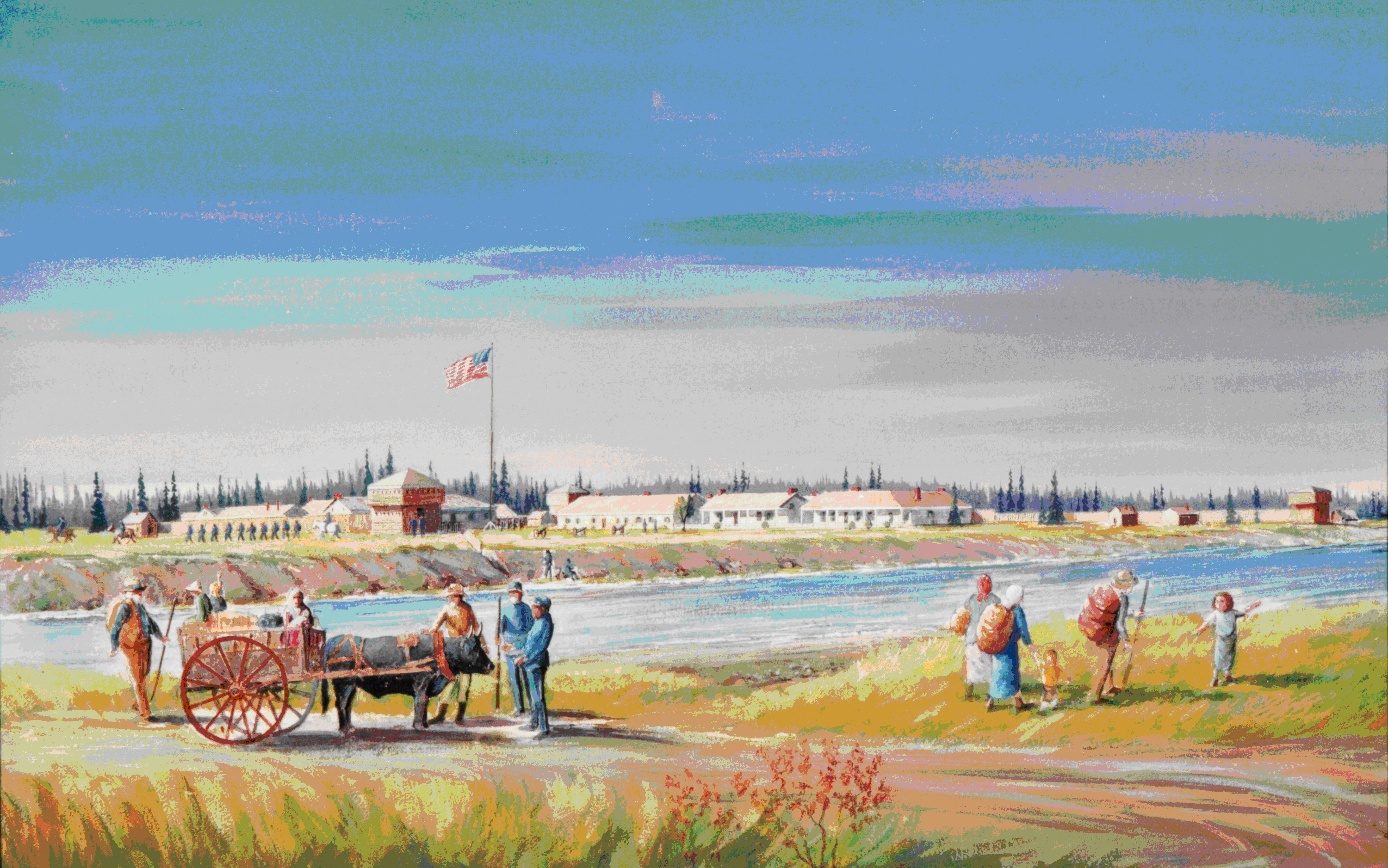
- View of Fort Ripley from across the Mississippi River

Site information
- Type: Fort
- Owner: United States Army
- Condition: Archaeological site, one standing building

Location
- Location in the U.S. state of Minnesota
- Coordinates: 46°10′32″N 94°22′23″W
- Area: 91 square miles (240 km^{2})

Site history
- Built: 1848–49
- In use: 1849–1877
- Fate: Decommissioned

Garrison information
- Past commanders: John Blair Smith Todd
- Garrison: 6th Infantry Regiment Co. A 5th Minnesota Infantry Co. C 8th Minnesota Infantry Hq
- Designations
- Fort Ripley
- U.S. National Register of Historic Places
- Location: 15000 Highway 115, Little Falls, Minnesota
- Area: 5.5 acres (2.2 ha)
- NRHP reference No.: 71000439
- Added to NRHP: September 10, 1971

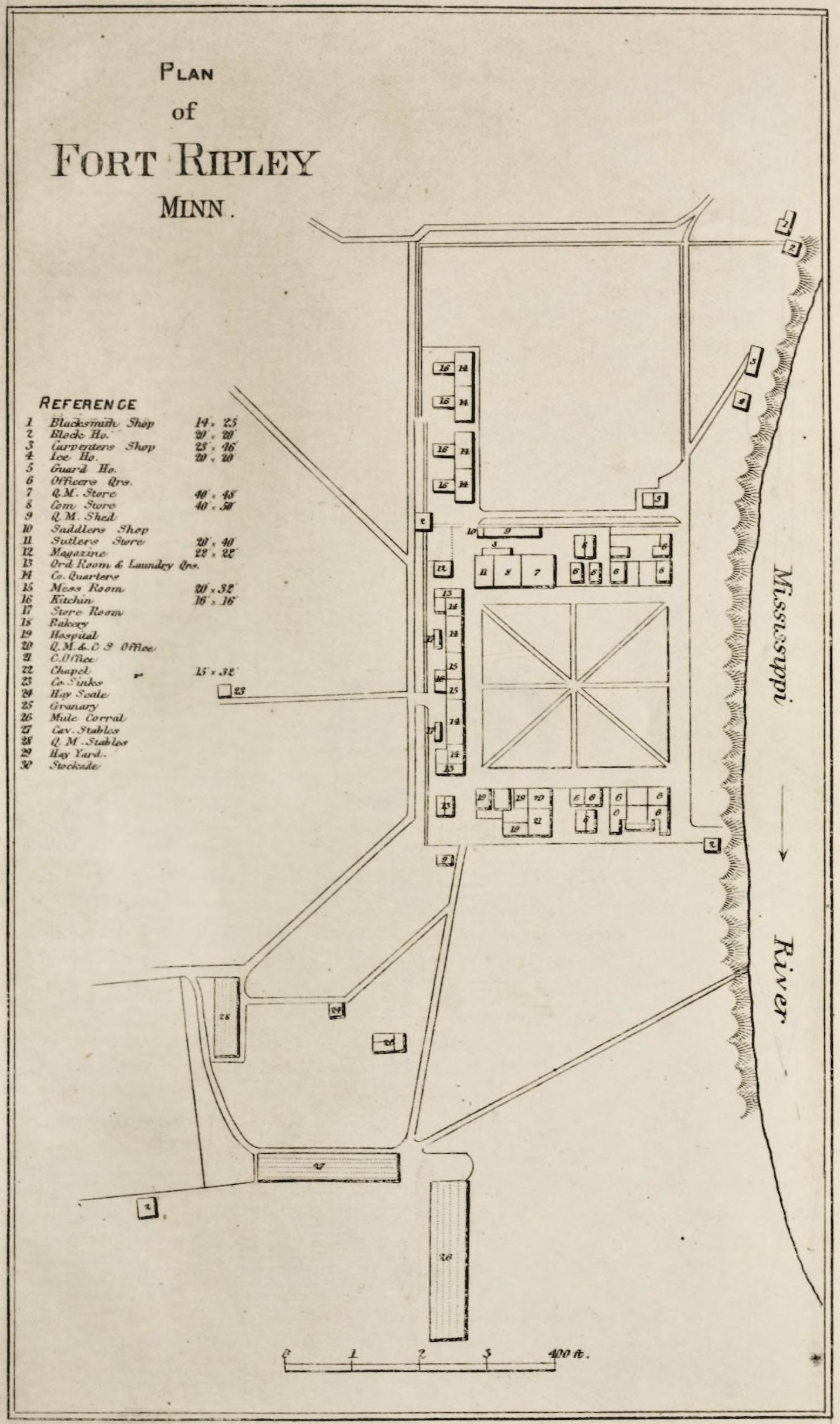
1876 plan of Fort Ripley

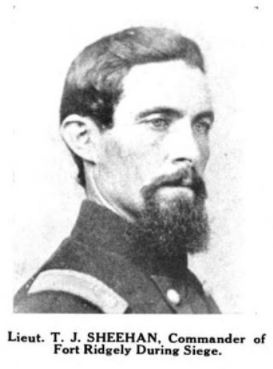
Timothy J. Sheehan, executive officer of C Company 5th Minnesota Infantry posted to Fort Ripley. Was sent to Fort Ridgley to assist administration duties at the Upper Sioux Agency for B Company. He assumed command of Fort after the hostilities broke out.

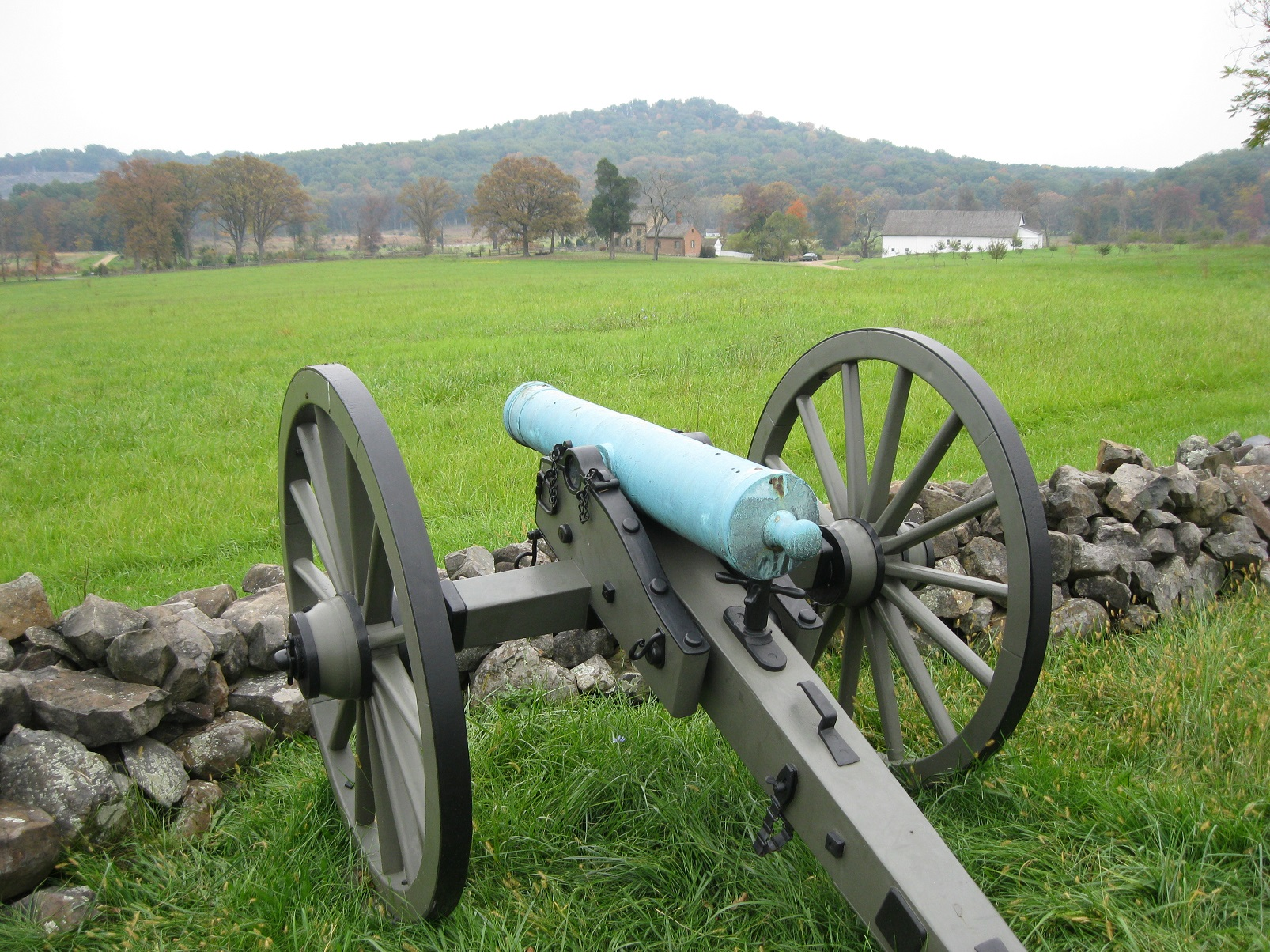
Bronze 12-pdr howitzer Fort Ripley had four.

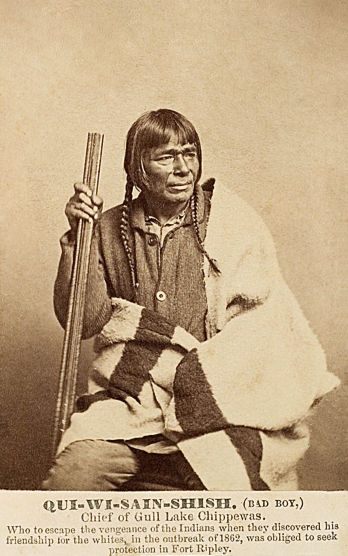
(Bad-Boy) or Qui-Wi-Sain-Shish, Gull Lake Chippewa-Chief who fled to Fort Ripley when Chief Hole-in-the Day learned that he supported the "whites". Photograph by Joel Emmons Whitney

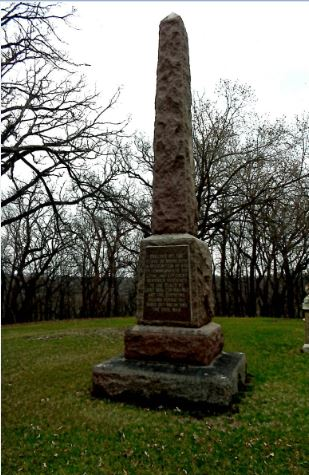
The State of Minnesota erected a monument to the Mille Lacs band of Chippewa at Fort Ridgely for their service at Fort Ripley.

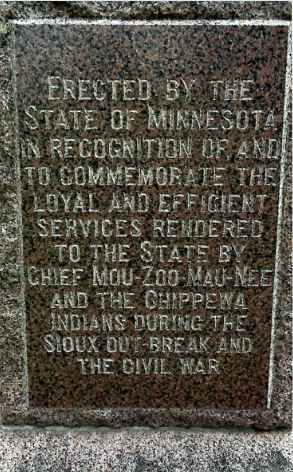
The State of Minnesota erected a monument to the Mille Lacs band at the Fort Ridgely site in 1914 as it was frequented by the public. The Fort Ripley site had been abandoned and unused.

Fort Ripley was a United States Army outpost on the upper Mississippi River, in mid-central Minnesota from 1848 to 1877. It was situated a few miles from the Indian agencies for the Ho-Chunk (and later with the new Crow Wing Chippewa Agency in the 1850s Ojibwe) in Iowa Territory and then the Minnesota Territory. It was still under construction when the Ho-Chunk arrived in summer 1848. In time, its presence spurred immigration into the area on the eastern (ceded) side of the Mississippi and the trading settlement of Crow Wing developed into a town on an island on the Crow Wing River approximately 6.75 miles (10.86 km) north of the fort when the agency for the Ojibwe was finally established there. Military protection had been stipulated in the 1846 treaty agreement with the Ho-Chunk and the Ojibwe agency was called for in the Ojibwe 1847 treaties at Fond du Lac and Leech Lake. The Ojibwe had been talked into making land available for the Ho-Chunk who had been temporarily removed from Wisconsin to the Neutral Ground of northern Iowa under the assumption that only Indians would live there, not whites. The second cession in 1847 was designated for the Menomonie and the Stockbridge-Oneida and small bands of other "New York Indians" (all of whom who refused to remove from eastern Wisconsin). The military post was initially named Fort Marcy. It then was renamed Fort Gaines and in 1850 was renamed again for distinguished Brigadier General Eleazer Wheelock Ripley of the War of 1812. It was the second major military reservation established in what would become Minnesota. A report in 1850 by General Pope also called for a third military installation to protect the Red River region of the large Territory that extended to the Missouri River, but Fort Abercrombie would not be built until the late 1850s.

In 1971 Fort Ripley was listed on the National Register of Historic Places for its state-level significance in the historical archaeology and military history categories. It was nominated for its status as Minnesota's second major military post and for its role in maintaining peace and enabling pioneer settlement in Central Minnesota.

Camp Ripley, a training facility of the Minnesota National Guard, was established in 1929. It includes the historic site of Fort Ripley and was named in its honor. The nearby city of Fort Ripley, Minnesota, was also named for the old outpost.

== Description ==
Fort Ripley typified remote mid-19th century army posts. The buildings were of timber construction, facing a quadrangle. The fort had a partial stockade with the side facing the river completely open except for two of the three block houses. It was on a navigable river and an important trade route. The location was geographically remote to Colonial-American population centers, with Native Americans living in the vicinity and in time it had been traversed by native people and by the French, British, and American fur traders who provisioned their customers via canoes and portages from Lake Superior until the goods were brought by steamboat and lesser watercraft up the Mississippi after the establishment of St. Paul.

== History ==
Fort Ripley was built in conjunction with the Ho-Chunk had been moved from northeastern Iowa. Their new reservation east of Long Prairie, Minnesota, necessitated a military post nearby to oversee the reservation and administer annuity payments. The government also hoped that the Ho-Chunk, and the fort, would serve as a buffer between the Santee Dakota and the Chippewa, who were warring. Construction began in November 1848. In April 1849, Company A of the 6th Infantry Regiment arrived from Fort Snelling to take up quarters under the command of Captain John Blair Smith Todd. With them were men of Company D 1st Dragoons commanded by 2nd Lt. John W.T. Gardiner.

Commanders and officers:

- General Dana oversaw the 2 years of construction, would become commander of the 1st Minnesota and promoted to brigadier general during the Civil war
- Capt. John Blair Smith Todd was the first commander. Became a Brigadier General. Captain Todd was a first cousin of Mary Todd Lincoln, the wife of Abraham Lincoln.
- Major George W. Patten Was commander of the Fort three times as well as at Fort Ridgely. He lost a hand in combat.
- Major Hannibal Day Also was commander of Fort Ridgely and would become a brevet Brigadier General.
- Major William S. McCaskey Was a Civil war hero and would become a major general.
- Capt. John C. Bates Was a hero of both the Civil and Philippine wars. He became a lieutenant general.
- Lt. Col. J.J. Abercrombie was commander of Fort Ripley twice and was commanding when the Civil War broke out. He became a Brigadier General.
- Lt. Timothy J. Sheehan would be promoted to a brevetted Lt. Colonel by the end of the Civil War. He was wounded twice at Fort Ridgely and twice at Nashville. In 1898 he commanded the right flank at the last fight with the Chippewa at Sugar Point where he was wounded 3 times.
- Capt. Samuel McLarty post commander sent forward and established Fort Pomme de Terre. Would be brevetted Lt. Colonel by the end of the Civil War.
- Capt. James L. Fisk Lead his second expedition to the gold fields in Montana Territory from Fort Ripley in 1863.

With occasional exceptions, daily life at Fort Ripley was uneventful. The geographic isolation, summer mosquitoes, and long, cold winters made post life challenging. The Metis oxcart trains traversing the eastern route of the Red River Trails between Selkirk – Fort Garry and the American Fur Trading outpost at Mendota/Fort Snelling(later Saint Paul) passed Fort Ripley. Twice each year, the soldiers trekked to the Long Prairie Agency to supervise government annuity payments of money and goods to the Ho-Chunk/Winnebago.

On July 18, 1850, Congress approved funds to build five military roads in the Minnesota Road Act. Two originated on Point Douglas, Minnesota at the confluence of the St. Croix and Mississippi Rivers. The first was named the Fort Ripley Military Wagon Road. It went north through Cottage Grove, Newport, St. Paul, St. Anthony Falls to Crow Wing seven miles past Fort Ripley. The distance from St. Paul to Fort Ripley via the wagon road was 150 miles.

In 1853 the Isaac Steven's Railway Survey passed through the Fort Ripley Reservation. It wouldn't be until the 1880s a rail line was constructed through the former fort's lands. The St. Paul and Pacific Railroad had held the right of way for many years, but it would be the Saint Paul, Minneapolis and Manitoba Railway that laid the track.

In 1855 C Co. 10th Infantry became the garrison, and the Ho-Chunk were forced to move again—to a reservation in Blue Earth County, Minnesota. The land ceded by the Ojibwe in 1847 was now assumed to be available to whites, though the 1857 Panic and its aftermath would discourage settlement for many years. Thinking the post was no longer needed, the army withdrew the garrison in 1857. Almost immediately, disturbances broke out between settlers and some Ojibwe, prompting reactivation of the fort by a Company of the 2nd Infantry. With the outbreak of the Civil War the Federal troops were replaced by the 5th Minnesota. A troop from the 2nd Minnesota Cavalry was part of the Fort late in the war. The Fort was garrisoned by A & G Companies 20th Infantry in April 1969. A Co. was immediately posted forward with G Co remaining until December 1877.

From 1857 to 1861 Companies G, I, L 2nd Artillery Regiment were variously posted to northern forts Snelling, Ridgely, and Ripley.

Typical of 19th-century army posts, Fort Ripley's military reservation was huge. It encompassed nearly 90 square miles (230 km^{2}) on the east side of the Mississippi, plus a single square mile on the west side to house the garrison. This configuration was chosen because the Ho-Chunk reservation abutted the west bank of the river and caused consternation for those who wanted the unused east side opened to homesteaders. In 1857 the army agreed to auction the eastern lands, but those bidding colluded to underbid. The Secretary of War annulled the sale. In the meantime, many had begun to build and farm the land. The resulting confusion and ensuing litigation took 20 years to resolve.

Military activity on the post intensified during the American Civil War. In January 1861, C and K Companies of the 2nd Infantry were sent south to fight Confederates, and were replaced by companies A and E from the 1st Minnesota who in turn were relieved by A and F Companies of 2nd Minnesota.

=== Minnesota's War 1862-66 ===
When hostilities broke at Fort Ridgely the commander of Fort Ripley was Captain Francis Hall, Company B 5th Minnesota, who was home on leave. The commanding officer at Fort Ridgely had requested assistance at the upper reservation. 1st Lt. Timothy J. Sheehan and 50 men of C Company had gone to the Upper Sioux Agency leaving a small garrison at Ripley under Lt. Frank B. Fobes. Sheehan had with him two of Ripley's four 12 pound howitzers. His troop arrived the first week of August at the Upper Sioux Agency and were quickly dispatched to bring in the renegade Chief Inkpaduta. They were unsuccessful in locating him and returned to the Agency. There, after a heated exchange, Sheehan had got the indian agent Galbraith to give out food to nearly 4,000 Sisseton and Whapeton. Thinking the task was completed the Fort Ripley men departed for their own post. There they were supposed to become the escort of a treaty commission to Georgetown on the Red river trail. The Red lake and Pembina Chippewa were waiting. A messenger caught up with them near Glencoe informing them of the attack at the Lower Sioux Agency and Redwood Ferry ambush. They double timed through the night to Fort Ridgely learning the post commander, Capt. Marsh, was dead. 1st Lt. Sheehan took command by rank and is credited with leading the Fort's defense. Meanwhile, at Fort Ripley, indian agent Lucius C. Walker had requested Lt. Forbes arrest Chief Hole-in-the-Day fearing he would attack. Hole-in-the-Day had departed shrewdly anticipating Walker. Upon his return to Ripley Capt. Hall declared martial law in the region and suggested settlers to evacuate. Three companies of militia joined the fort, one from St. Cloud, Stillwater, and Olmstead County.

Despite an undercurrent of mistrust, relations between settlers and Chippewa was mainly peaceful in northern Minnesota. That nearly changed when the Santee Sioux hostilities broke out. According to the media, Chief Hole in the Day of the Gull Lake Band considered the Sioux conflict as an opportunity to gain leverage for redress of grievances by threatening to launch a simultaneous war in northern Minnesota. The rumors caused fearful settlers to flock to Fort Ripley for security. Not all of Hole-In-the Day's Gull Lake band were in agreement with him. Chief Qui-We-Sain-Shish (Bad Boy) went to Fort Ripley on his own. Company's from both the 6th and 7th Minnesota were rushed to the post. Word reached the Mille Lacs Band reservation that Chief Hole-in-the-Day was considering attacking the fort. Head civil Chief Shaw-Bosh-Kung of the Mille Lacs Band of Ojibwe organized his band and lead 700-750 warriors to Fort Ripley to defend the fort and to volunteer to fight the Sioux. According to the record they presented a sight waving flags and beating drums. Later the 27th Iowa recorded that the Mille Lacs had a U.S. flag and one that they had made with and eagle and stars. The Indian commissioner Dole met with them and told them to return to the reservation and they would be contacted if their assistance was needed. Dole also gave the Mille Lacs a document in appreciation of the Mille Lacs offer stating that they could stay on their reservation for a 1000 years. War Chief Mou-zoo-mau-nee and 300 warriors remained at Ripley to augment in its defense, 200 from the Mille Lacs band along with 100 from the Sandy Lake and Snake River and Chippewa River Bands. According to Chief Mou-zoo-mau-nee's obituary the people of Little Falls asked for protection. The town was 15 miles downriver from the fort. He sent 150 warriors. The town's woman prepared a welcome meal and the men smoked the peace pipe with the warriors. Shortly after the executions in Makato the Chippewa leaders were summoned to Washington where Lincoln repeated that the Milles Lacs could remain on their reservation for a 1000 years. It was also written into the treaty they signed in Article 12. The Chippewa signed another treaty in 1864 where it is reiterated with the addition that the Sandy Lake band could not be moved without Presidential approval. The State erected a large monument to the Chief and the Mille Lacs band at Fort Ridgely in 1914. In recognition for their service to the State the participating bands were designated as "non-removable". On September 2 two Chiefs of the Fond du Lac band were the first to send Lincoln an offer to fight the Sioux.

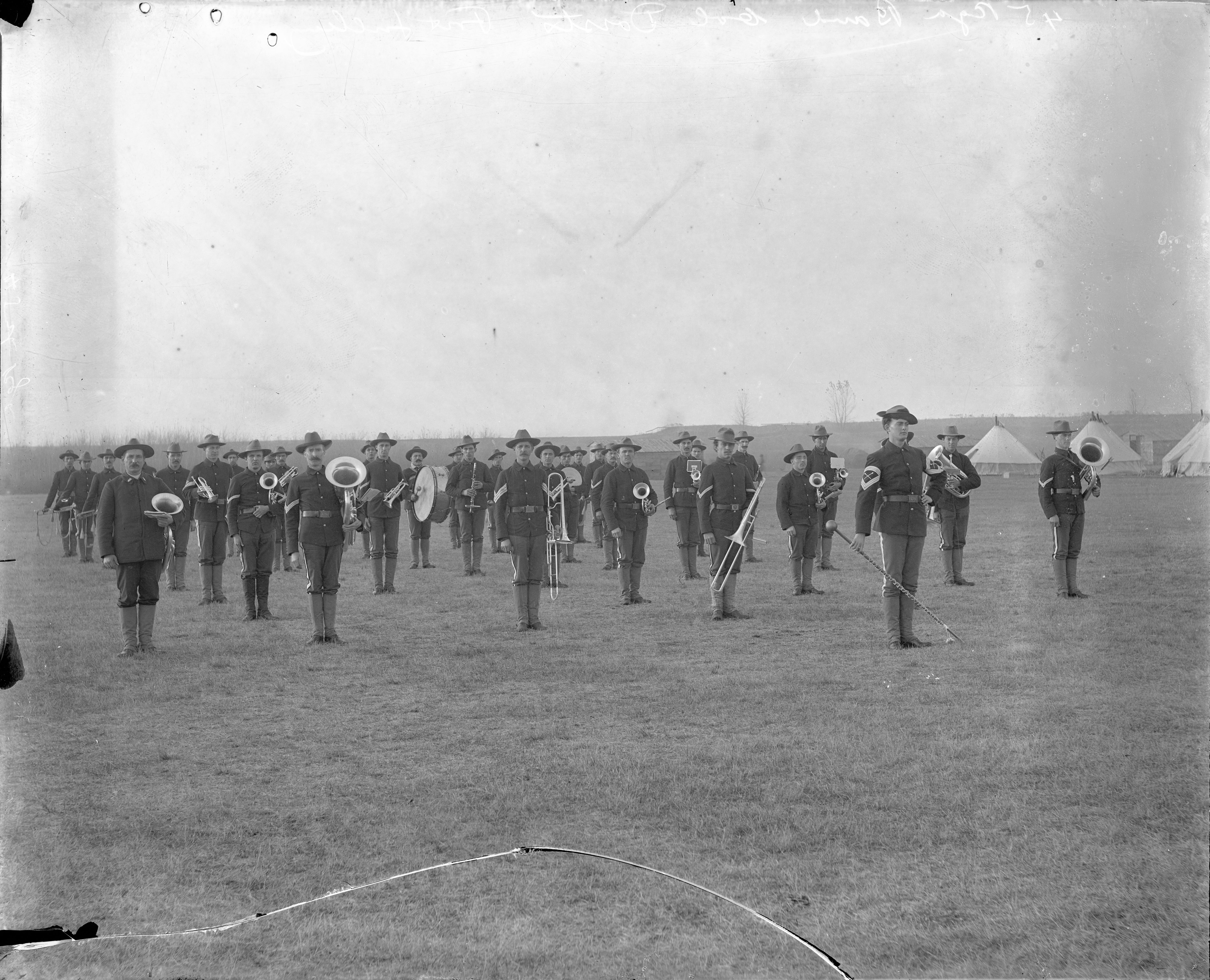
Band of the 14th Infantry Regiment at Fort Ripley.

On September 8, 1862 a Mille Lacs Band Chief with 75-100 warriors was met and stopped at Watab, Minnesota just north of St. Cloud. They wanted to join the government forces fighting the Sioux. Fort Ripley was informed and Capt. Hall invited the Chippewa to come to the fort as guests of the State to await a decision on their offer. Fall-winter of 1862–63 Fort Ripley became the headquarters for the 8th Minnesota. The regiment had four companies posted there. In the end of January 1863, Captain Samuel McLarty and D Co 8th Minnesota were ordered from Fort Ripley to garrison at Pomme de Terre and Chippewa Station. After arriving at Pomme de Terre orders came to erect a palisade 9 feet in height creating Fort Pomme de Terre, the largest garrison point between St. Cloud and Fort Abercrombie on the Red River Trail. The other companies were posted to Manannah, Little Falls, Chippewa Station and Fort Abercrombie. In 1864 the 8th Minnesota lost more men to the continuing hostilities from the uprising than Sibley's entire expedition lost in the Dakota Territory.

Hole-in-Day's threat was mitigated by reasoned negotiating. For the next three years Fort Ripley was a staging point for western military campaigns in the on going war. The 8th Minnesota was posted there as were 2 sections of the 3rd Minnesota Light Artillery and troops of the 2nd Minnesota Cavalry Regiment. In May 1864 Company G of the 1st U.S. Volunteer Infantry Regiment were posted there as well. Fort activity peaked during the winter of 1863–1864, when 400 cavalry troops and 500 horses were posted at Ripley. In June 1865 Companies A, F, G and I of the 1st U.S. Volunteers(exConfederates) met at Fort Ripley for discharge, but were instead posted to Kansas.

Fort Ripley's garrison, Co. C, 5th Minnesota, at the battle of Fort Ridgely:

- First Lieutenant T. J. Sheehan, Commanding
- Sergeants, John P. Hicks, F. A. Blackmer (wounded) John C. Ross.
- Corporals, M. A. Chamberlain, Z. C. Butler, Wm. Young, Dennis Porter (wounded).
- Privates, S. P. Beighley, E. D. Brooks, J. M. Brown, J. L. Bullock, Chas. E Chapel, Zachariah Chute, Sidney Cook, L. H. Decker, Chas. Dills, Chas. H. Dills, Daniel Dills, S. W. Dogan, L. A. Eggleston, Halvor Elefson, Martin Ellingson, C. J. Grandy, Mark M. Greer (killed), J. P Green, A. K. Grout, Andrew Gulbranson, Peter E. Harris (wounded), Philo Henry, James Honan, D. N. Hunt, L. C. Jones, N. I. Lowthian, A. J. Luther (wounded), John Malachy, John McCall, Orlando McFall, F. M. McReynolds, J. H. Mead, J. B. Miller, Dennis Morean, Peter Nisson, Andrew Peterson, J. M. Rice, Chas. A. Rose, B. F. Ross, Edward Roth, C. O. Russell, W. S. Russell, Isaac Shortledge (wounded), Josiah Weakley, G. H. Wiggins, J. M. Ybright, James Young.

In June 1865 the 10th Infantry returned to Fort Snelling and Companies A and I were posted to Fort Ripley.

On April 20, 1869 the 20th Infantry Regiment arrived at Fort Snelling and Companies A and G were the relief sent to Fort Ripley. In May A Co. was sent to Fort Totten, North Dakota.

On a sub-zero night in January 1877, fire destroyed three buildings. Believing the post had outlived its purpose, the War Department decided to permanently close it rather than rebuild. The troops moved out that summer. The buildings stood abandoned for many years. By 1910, the ruins of the gunpowder magazine, built of stone, were all that remained.

== Legacy ==
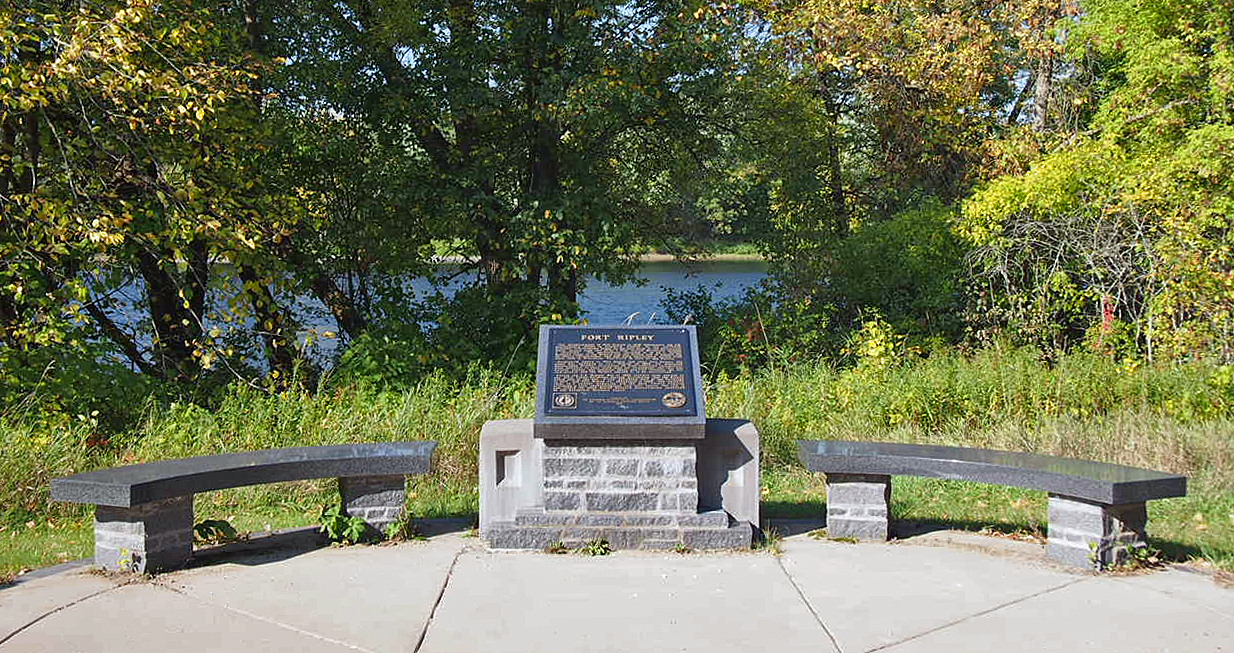
Fort Ripley historical marker directly across the Mississippi River from the original site

On December 16, 1879, the United States House of Representatives passed the bill H.R. 1153 "An Act to Restore to the public domain part of the Military Reservation known as Fort Ripley Reservation" except for the land occupied by the railroad. Alexander Ramsey, then Secretary of War passed the amendment for the railroad land to the Senate on January 6, 1880, and was entered in the record of the Senate February 4, 1880.

In 1929, the State of Minnesota announced that a new National Guard training site would be built in central Minnesota. The land had to be purchased and, purely by coincidence, the remains of old Fort Ripley were within the proposed boundaries of what the State purchased. The new post—Camp Ripley—took its name from the old.

== See also ==
- National Register of Historic Places listings in Morrison County, Minnesota
