= Battle of Fort Ridgely =

Battle of the American Civil War

- Part of the Dakota War of 1862, American Civil War
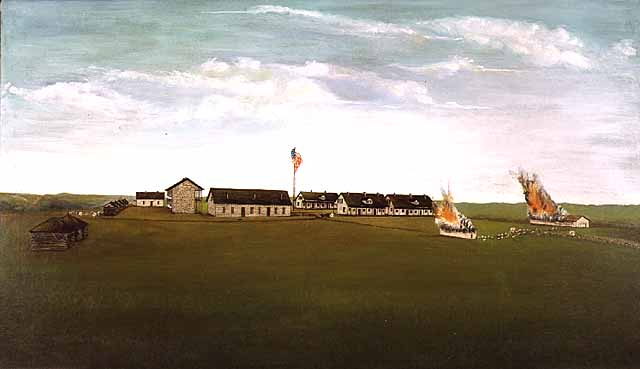
- Fort Ridgely burning (1890 oil painting)
Date	August 20, 1862 – August 22, 1862
Location	Nicollet County, Minnesota 44°27′04″N 94°43′51″W
Result	United States victory

Belligerents
United States	Santee Sioux

Commanders and leaders
Capt. John S. Marsh; Lt. Timothy J. Sheehan	Chief Little Crow

Units involved
Companies B and C 5th Minnesota Infantry; Renville Rangers	

Strength
210 (August 22)	400–600 (August 20); 800–1,000 (August 22)

Casualties and losses
3 killed 1 mortally wounded 13 wounded	2 confirmed killed 5 confirmed wounded

The Battle of Fort Ridgely was an early battle in the Dakota War of 1862. As the closest U.S. military post to the Lower Sioux Agency, the lightly fortified Fort Ridgely quickly became both a destination for refugees and a target of Dakota warbands after the attack at the Lower Sioux Agency. It came under attack by the Dakota on August 20, 1862, two days after a company of soldiers responding from the fort to the attack on the Lower Sioux Agency had been ambushed and defeated at the Battle of Redwood Ferry. The Dakota besieged and partially destroyed the fort, but were unable to storm it before the August 27 arrival of Colonel Henry Sibley with 1,400 men from Fort Snelling prompted them to retreat.

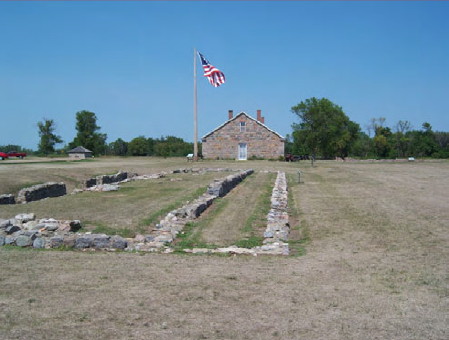
The ruins of historic Fort Ridgely

== Background ==
Built between 1853 and 1855 in the southern part of what was then the territory of Minnesota, Fort Ridgely was the only military post between the Dakota Reservation and the settlers of central Minnesota. As of August 18, 1862, the fort was garrisoned by 76 men and two officers of Company B of the 5th Minnesota Infantry Regiment, under the command of Captain John S. Marsh, who had fought in the Civil War in the First Battle of Bull Run. The fort had no stockade, trenches, or other fortifications.

On August 18, 1862, the Lower Sioux Agency in Renville County, Minnesota, was attacked by Dakota men. They had come to the Agency to barter for the food that had been withheld from them and starvation had set in. The primary Indian Agent was against it, but the other men persuaded him to give the Dakota a small amount of porkback and flour. The Agent then added that the food would only be delivered to the reservation in the morning and only if the Dakota returned to the reservation immediately. Until that point, the well-armed Dakota men had stood by peacefully in the hot August temperatures. The greatly out-numbered 67 white men gathered there became uncomfortable with the stipulation and began to form small groups to head back to their homes.

Fighting broke out as some of the Dakota men pursued the departing whites, while the rest surrounded those holed up in Agency buildings. Within a few hours 20 white settlers had been killed and 10 captured. Some white settlers escaped, heading for Fort Ridgely, while the majority tried to race for their homes and families. The men heading for their homes made plans to assemble in the morning to try to reach the fort.

Mr. J.C. Dickinson, who seems to have been the first to escape, took his family in a wagon to Fort Ridgely, where nobody believed that there had been an attack. More settlers arrived, convincing Captain Marsh that the Agency had been attacked. Marsh ordered Drummer Charles M. Culver, a twelve-year-old (who would die in 1943, at 93, as Company B's last survivor) to beat the long-roll. About 74 men fell in, amongst who were Captain Marsh, Second Lieutenant Thomas P. Gere, about 4 sergeants, 7 corporals, and about 62 privates. Marsh chose 46 men, along with Dakota Interpreter Peter Quinn, to set out for the Agency. The soldiers passed burning buildings and numerous fresh corpses of men, women, and children on their way.

At Redwood Ferry Marsh's party was ambushed by the Dakota under White Dog. Quinn, the interpreter, was one of the first killed, along with about 10 of the soldiers. By late afternoon, Capt. Marsh had only eleven men left in his command, with twenty-four having been killed. Marsh decided to head back to the fort and tried to take the men across the Minnesota River. Marsh was a strong swimmer, but he was seized by a cramp and would drown, despite the efforts of three of his men to save him. Sergeant John F. Bishop, the ranking officer, did order Privates John Brennan, James Dunn, and Stephen Van Buren to swim for Marsh. Brennan reached him first, and Marsh grabbed Brennan's shoulder but fell off. Marsh drowned and the men saw his body float by in the river. He was about 28 when he died. Sergeant Bishop led the remaining eleven back to the fort, arriving shortly before midnight.

The defeat of Marsh and B Company, combined with the departure of Lieutenant Timothy J. Sheehan, had left Fort Ridgely severely undermanned, and it had no fortifications. Little Crow held a war council outside Fort Ridgely but chose to attack New Ulm on August 19 instead, giving time for reinforcements to reach the fort. Oscar Wall ascribes this miscalculation to dissension among the Dakota and their mistaken belief that the fort held more than 100 trained soldiers.

Before Marsh left, he had sent word to Lt. Sheehan, who left Fort Ridgely on August 17, to return with the 50 men of Company C, Fifth Minnesota. Sheehan arrived at the fort on August 18. Upon Bishop's report of the ambush at Redwood Ferry after arrival at the fort that night, Bishop and Sheehan sent a Private William J. Sturgis to ride through the night and spread the warning of the uprising, including to Minnesota Governor Alexander Ramsey about the uprising. Sturgis rode through the night, covering the 125 miles in eighteen hours. Lt. Norman K. Culver, Company B, and others responded to Sturgis's plea by recruiting volunteers in St. Paul, who arrived at Fort Ridgely with the "Renville Rangers" as reinforcements on the evening August 19. There were about 50 white men under First Lieutenant James Gorman, men who were going to muster into Civil War Service, but went instead to Fort Ridgely with a Harper rifle and three rounds of ammunition each. Altogether, about 70 Minnesota citizens volunteered. About 10 of them were women and others were related to soldiers. Company B membership rose from about 65 to over 200. Some notables include Sutler B.H. Randall, Ordnance Sergeant John Jones, Dr. Alfred Muller, and Major E.A.C. Hatch, an experienced cavalry man who would one day lead Hatch's Battalion, Minnesota Volunteer Cavalry.

By the morning of August 20 the number of civilian refugees sheltering at the small fort had surpassed 300.

== Battle ==
At 1 o'clock in the afternoon of August 20, Little Crow rode out alone into the open beyond the picket line west of the fort, close enough to be recognized but just out of musket range. After Sergeant Bishop offered to meet him at the picket line rather than rushing out in an attempt to capture him, the diversion was revealed as shots rang out from the wooded ravine near the northeast corner of the fort. Little Crow's force of 400 Dakota was only prevented from reaching the fort by Lieutenant Gere's decision to move his howitzer into the open northwest of the building while under fire from the Dakota and clear the field north of the fort with canister shot.

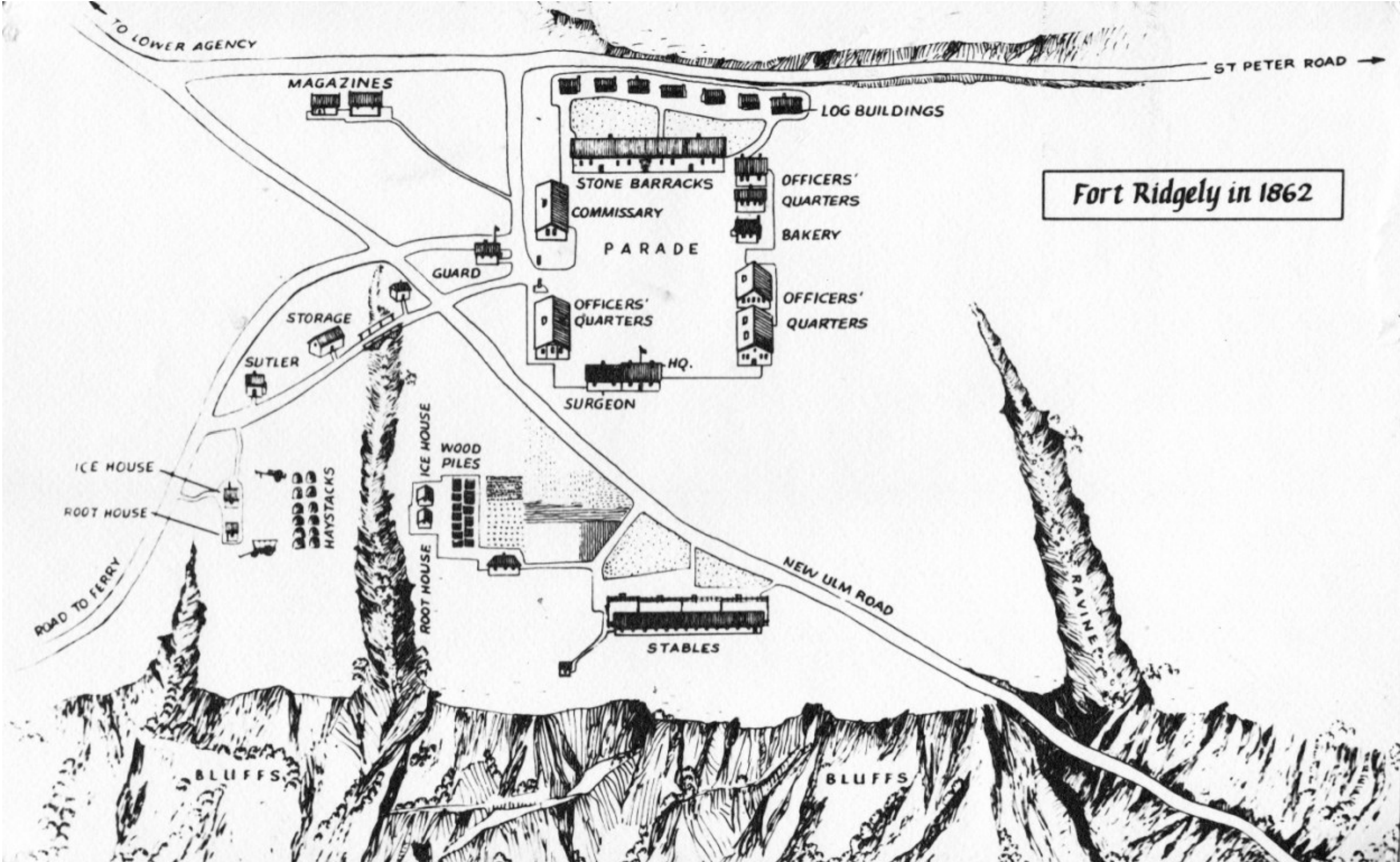
Fort Ridgely in 1862

Unable to reach the fort from the northeast and overwhelm its outnumbered defenders in hand-to-hand combat, the Dakota offensive gradually spread around the fort until Little Crow attempted to enter the fort en masse from an advantageous position to its southwest. Sergeant Jones, supported by Lieutenants Culver and Gorman and the Renville Rangers, held the Dakota at bay with his six-pound field gun. The battle continued until nightfall, but the Dakota were unable to take the fort.

On August 20, 1st Lt. Timothy J. Sheehan, C Company, commanded Fort Ridgely. Captain Marsh had been the post commander until he died at the Battle of Redwood Ferry two days before. 1st Lt. Culver, B Company, was quartermaster-commissary. Eight men were wounded or assigned hospital duty. The first shots killed Private Mark. M. Greer, Co. C, and wounded Corporal William Good, Co. B. Good had a head wound and was declared dead, but survived and was discharged for disability in October. Sergeant Bishop commanded the pickets. Several soldiers were wounded. Private William H. Blodgett, Company B, was wounded in the spinal column but continued to fight. By the end of the battle three soldiers were killed and another 13 wounded.

The next day it rained, so the men and women worked at preparing the fort and strengthening the defenses. Ordnance Sergeant Jones had three six-pound cannons, two twelve pounders, and one twenty-four pound gun positioned. The 24-pounder was his while Sgts. James G. McGrew and Bishop commanded the twelve pounders.

On August 22 the Dakota again attacked the fort, this time with more than 800 men. The first attack came from the southwest and succeeded in capturing two outbuildings, but was repelled after McGrew intentionally shelled one to start a fire and the Dakota burned the other before retreating. Dakota attempts to set fire to the rest of the fort with flaming arrows failed, as the shingles were still damp from the previous day's rains. Still, the larger Dakota force managed to reach the fort, and was only repulsed after Jones fired canister shot at them from close range after Little Crow gave the order for his men to club their guns and rush the fort. Nearly out of ammunition, the garrison resorted to firing 3/4" sections of iron bars from the blacksmith shop that had been cut to size under the direction of Mrs. Muller.

Towards evening the Dakota staged a more serious attack from the north. Lt. Sheehan was forced to order the buildings on that side to be set ablaze to stop the Indians sneaking into the Fort through them. It is recorded the buildings went up in a greenish smoke.

Fighting at the fort ceased the night of August 22 and did not resume, though the garrison at Fort Ridgeley remained inside the fort until August 27, when Colonel Henry H. Sibley arrived with 1,400 from Fort Snelling.
