= 5th Minnesota Infantry Regiment =

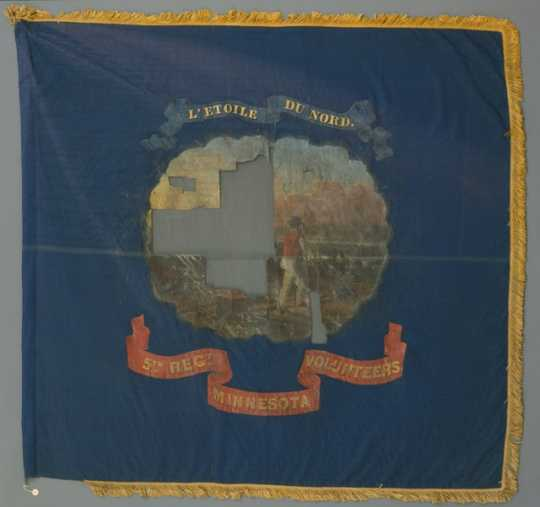
- Battle Flag of the Fifth Minnesota Infantry Regiment 1862-1865
- Active: March 15, 1862, to August 7, 1865
- Country: United States
- Allegiance: Union
- Branch: Infantry
- Engagements: American Civil War: Siege of Corinth; Action at Farmington; Dakota War of 1862; Battle of Redwood Ferry; Battle of Fort Ridgely; Fort Abercrombie; Iuka-Corinth Operations; Battle of Iuka; Second Battle of Corinth; Vicksburg Campaign; Battle of Jackson; Assault of May 22, 1863; Battle of Richmond; Red River Campaign; Battle of Fort DeRussy; Battle of Henderson's Hill; Battle of Pleasant Hill; Battle of Mansura; Lake Village Expedition; Battle of Old River Lake; Forrest's Defense of Mississippi; Battle of Tupelo; Franklin-Nashville Campaign; Battle of Nashville; Mobile Campaign; Battle of Spanish Fort; Battle of Fort Blakeley

Commanders
- Notable commanders: Lucius Frederick Hubbard; William B. Gere

The 5th Minnesota Infantry Regiment was a Minnesota USV infantry regiment that served in the Union Army in the Western Theater of the American Civil War and Dakota War of 1862. The regiment distinguished itself serving in its home state and the south, particularly at the Battles of Fort Ridgely, Corinth and Nashville.

== History ==
=== Organization and early service ===
On October 23, 1861, Assistant Secretary of War Thomas A. Scott sent correspondence to Minnesota Governor Alexander Ramsey, authorizing him to raise a fifth regiment of infantry in the state. The 5th Minnesota Infantry Regiment was mustered into Federal service at Fort Snelling, Minnesota, between March 15 and April 30, 1862. The Regiment was split with B Company posted to Fort Ridgely, Company C to Fort Ripley, Company D to Fort Abercrombie. Companies A and E-K sailed off to fight in the Civil War. The 5th Minnesota was the last regiment raised in response to President Lincoln's first call for 500,000 men.

Original Organization of Regiment in 1862.
Company	Earliest Moniker	Primary Place of Recruitment	Earliest Captain
A	Ramsey Guards or Goodhue Company	Goodhue and Dodge counties	Lucius Frederick Hubbard
B	Fillmore County Guards	Fillmore county	William B. Gere
C	McClellan Guards or Freeborn County Guards	Freeborn county	Francis Hall
D	Schützen-Compagnie	Carver and Ramsey counties	John Charles Vanderhorck
E	Nelson Guards or German Company	Ramsey, Carver, and Scott counties	John C. Becht
F	Wilkinson Zouaves	Waseca, Ramsey, Faribault, and Anoka counties	Ebenezer Rice
G		Wabash and Dakota counties	Orlando Eddy
H	Pine Island Guards	Goodhue and Wabash counties	Otis H. Clark
I		Ramsey and Olmstead counties	Luther E. Clark
K	Irish Company	Washington county	Gold T. Curtis

=== First Corinth ===
==== Farmington ====
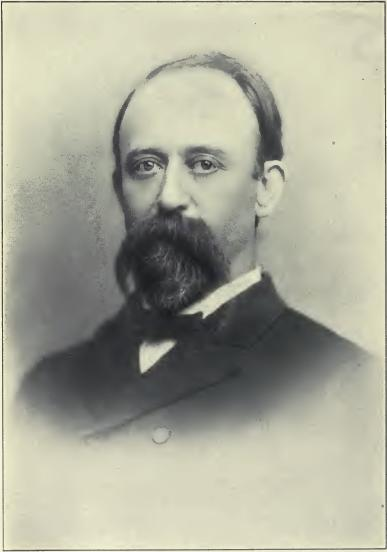
Post-war photo of Bvt Brig. Gen. Lucius F Hubbard USV, 5th Minnesota. Former Col. of said regiment.

Companies A, E-K were ordered south in May 1862 and joined the II brigade, I division of Major General John Pope in the Army of the Mississippi on May 24, 1862, to take part in the Siege of Corinth. Before the regiment could settle in camp, they were called into action four days later to take part in the Battle of Farmington. The action served as the regiment's baptism of fire and they contributed a number of casualties; more of which succumbed to the effects of heat and exhaustion throughout the campaign.

=== Dakota War of 1862 ===
==== Redwood Ferry ====
At the outbreak of the Dakota War of 1862 on August 18, 1862, companies B, C and D of the 5th Minnesota were the only immediate military forces available to defend the frontier until the arrival of reinforcements from Fort Snelling. As bands of the Dakota advanced along the Minnesota River, survivors fled to Fort Ridgely which was then garrisoned by Company B, numbering, under Captain John S. Marsh. A detachment set out with 46 men under Cpt. Marsh to investigate the situation.

Upon reaching the Ferry, Marsh found a Dakota man named White Dog and spoke to him through the interpreter Peter Quinn. Suspicious of the man, he advanced his men toward the river bed in line formation. Suddenly, gunshots rang out on all sides, inflicting losses on the detachment. The men returned fire, advanced and engaged in limited hand-to-hand combat before withdrawing to a nearby thicket for cover. However, the Dakota had men placed there as well. With no alternative, Marsh began guiding his men across the river before being seized by a leg cramp, which drowned him. It was up to Sergeant John F. Bishop to lead the 20 survivors across and reach Fort Ridgely. The survivors reached the outpost at 10:00 pm. Eight more survivors, who hid near the ferry, returned later. Company B suffered heavily, casualties are numbered at 24 killed, 1 drowned, and 5 wounded.

==== Fort Ridgely ====
===== Situation on August 18 =====
As survivors of the Ambush at Redwood Ferry returned the night of August 18, 1862, 22 out of 51 remaining men of Company B were counted as effectives due to the rest suffering from illness. Second Lieutenant Thomas P. Gere took command of the garrison in the absence of his commander, sending for help from First Lieutenant Timothy J. Sheehan of Company C, at the time en route to Fort Ripley. 50 men of Company C, along with roughly 50 other reinforcements arriving the next morning. 1st Lt. Sheehan took command of the Fort upon arrival, which was now home to 300 refugees, and a garrison of around 180 men. There was no attack on the 19th; instead an attempt on New Ulm would be made by the Santees.

===== Action of August 20 =====
Chief Little Crow finally began the battle on the Fort's northeast corner and drove out the soldiers posted to the outbuildings shortly after 1:00 pm. Lieutenant Gere sent a detachment of Company B with Sergeant McGrew to return fire with two twelve-pound howitzers, eventually dispersing the advancing warriors with canister shot. Little Crow then joined the attack personally at the southwest corner, where Ordnance Sergeant Jones, supported by the Renville Rangers, wheeled a six-pound field gun in position whilst under fire. Carefully aimed shots discouraged further assault. The makeshift artillerists of Company B were trained by Sgt. Jones, Sgt. McGrew of Company B, and Mexican War veteran John Whipple. Fighting kept on for five more hours, but the Dakota failed to overwhelm the defenders despite all efforts and withdrew at nightfall.

===== Action of August 22 =====
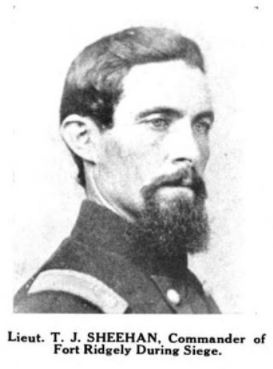
1st Lieutenant Timothy J. Sheehan was the Executive officer of C Company 5th Minnesota Infantry posted to Fort Ripley. He was sent to Fort Ridgley to assist administration of annuities at the Upper Sioux Agency for B Company. He assumed command of Fort Ridgely by rank after the hostilities broke out. He retired as Lt. Colonel

On the 22nd, Little Crow was reinforce. Bolstered, he decided to launch another attack surrounding the whole fort at 1:00 pm. The first attack was made in the hopes of breaching the fort through force of numbers, but was repulsed. The warriors returned to the slopes surrounding the fort and fired from their safety, attempting to exhaust the defenders of their low reserves of ammunition. The chief gathered the strength of his forces at the southwest corner, charged, and succeeded in capturing the stables. Sergeant McGrew wheeled his twelve-pound howitzer into position and fired into the stables, intentionally setting them ablaze. Dakota bowmen fired flame-tipped arrows onto the roofs of some buildings in retaliation, but the shingles were still wet from the previous day's rainfall and failed to catch fire. When attempting to rush the fort, Sergeant Jones managed to disperse the Dakota with close-range canister. An assault on the northwest corner was repelled that evening, which was discouraged by the burning of one of the buildings and combined artillery and infantry fire, including a 24-pounder cannon brought into action by Sgt. McGrew. No other attacks commenced after the 22nd, but the garrison remained until the 27th when Colonel Henry Hastings Sibley arrived with 1,400 men from eastern Minnesota.

==== Attacks on Fort Abercrombie ====
===== August 18 - September 3 =====
When war broke out on August 18, 1862, Company D of the 5th Minnesota had garrisoned Fort Abercrombie in the Dakota Territory under the command of Captain John Vander Horck since March. A detachment of 30 men under 1st Lieutenant Francis A. Cariveau were placed at Georgetown, 52 miles north on the Red River of the North. News of the outbreak arrived on August 19. Vander Horck immediately ordered Cariveau's detachment and anyone else in the area return to the fort. Signs of enemy presence were noted when mutilated bodies were discovered near Breckenridge. On the 23rd, messengers were hurried out to request reinforcements and ammunition from St. Paul. Defenses were prepared right away and were mostly completed by August 29. On September 3, Capt. Vander Horck was shot accidentally in the right arm by a frightened picket; leaving 2nd Lt. Groetch in command of the fort as 1st Lt. Cariveau was sick. One hour later, the Sioux attacked from the southwest corner, and the skirmish lasted from 5:00-11:00 am, until the warriors fell back on their camp.

===== September 6 =====
The next few days were unnerving for the defenders, but largely uneventful. Another attack began on the 6th with the Sioux, numbering around 400, attacking the fort's stables first; during which a short fight ensued until they were driven back. A second attack commenced from the east, south and west sides of the fort. Resistance from the fort's howitzer and the infantry of Company D just managed to keep the braves from overwhelming the breastworks. From the 6th, no more larger attacks were made. Finally, on September 23, 500 reinforcements arrived with fresh ammunition under Captain Burger. Fort Abercrombie was the last action of the 5th Minnesota in the Dakota War of 1862. The garrison suffered 4 men killed and 2 wounded throughout the weeks of the siege.

=== Camp Clear Creek to Iuka ===
While companies B-D fought in Minnesota itself, companies A and E-K continued campaigning with the Union army in the south. The regiment was encamped at Clear Camp Creek, Mississippi. Here, Colonel Borgesrode resigned. Lucius F. Hubbard was promoted to Colonel and William B. Gere was promptly promoted to Major. The Army of the Mississippi, now under the command of Major General William Rosecrans, soon met with Sterling Price's Army of the West at Iuka, Mississippi, on September 19, 1862. Here, the Regiment skirmished in the rearguard, but did not participate in the main engagement. As the II brigade, I division marched toward Corinth, it is claimed that the regiment was nearly overwhelmed by a large crowd of freedmen (referred to by the soldiers as "contrabands") fleeing Confederate pursuit. The battle ended in a Union victory, but a withdrawal back to Corinth went underway.

=== Second Corinth ===
Rosecrans eventually combined with the forces of Maj. Gen Ulysses S. Grant at Corinth, where the 5th Minnesota had its first action earlier that year. The 5th now took place in the II brigade, II division of the Army of the Mississippi. On October 3, 1862, the combined forces of Confederate Generals Sterling Price and Earl Van Dorn attacked the Union lines. The rebels managed to push back the northerners, and the men of the 5th Minnesota could hear the sounds of battle headed their way, however the Minnesotans would not see action until the next day. By night, the regiment was ordered to leave its position at Tuscumbia Creek and move to the town itself.

==== October 4 ====
The regiment was called into line early on the 4th and almost immediately the lines of both armies engaged in an artillery duel. Another barrage of artillery opened around 11:00 am and the day's fighting began. The Confederate assault managed to break through the Union right flank as rebel troops poured into the streets of Corinth. The 5th Minnesota would distinguish itself at this crucial point in the battle. The regiment advanced to the breakthrough, fired several volleys into the flanks of advancing Confederates and pushed out the assailants at bayonet point. They proceeded to chase the enemy all the way to the federal guns lost earlier that day and aided in their recapture. II Division's Brigadier general David S. Stanley complimented the regiment for its decisive intervention.

Maj. Gen. Rosecrans wrote to and thanked the then regimental Chaplain, Archbishop John Ireland, on the conduct of the 5th Minnesota at Corinth:

Yes, you were with me at the battle of Corinth, Miss., Oct. 3 and 4, 1862. We were of the 17,500 patriots, dying and living, who offered up their best that this nation might live. You wish me to write what I remember of the services in that battle of the Fifth Minnesota, United States Volunteer Infantry. There were many things to think of at that time, and many things when writing my official report of it which excluded observation of numerous details, and of individual and regimental action. The memory of many I then noted, but did not recount, has been laid under twenty-seven years of strivings in the battle of life. The sunshine of young manhood has given place to the grayer lights of autumn, yet when digging down I find the events of the Fifth Minnesota's work on the 4th come vividly before me. Colonel Mower had ordered the Fifth Minnesota to guard the bridge across the Tuscumbia on the 3d, when, with the remainder of the brigade, he went to help Davies. Late in the evening Colonel Hubbard brought up his regiment and formed facing westward on the Mobile & Ohio railway, with its left near the depot, where they bivouacked for the night. On the next morning, when the enemy from the north assaulted our line and forced it back a few hundred yards into the edge of town, Colonel Hubbard, moving by his right flank, faced the coming storm from that quarter, and, by his promptitude, anticipated General Stanley's order from me, to use the reserves of his division in meeting the enemy s charge. He drove back the fragments of his columns, overtaking and bringing back some pieces without horses of our reserve artillery, which the enemy had seized, and covering the retiring of a battery which had gone too far to the front. Veterans could hardly have acted more opportunely and effectively than did the gallant Fifth Minnesota on that occasion. God bless the members of the gallant Fifth and the land we love!

=== Vicksburg campaign ===
==== The regiment comes together ====
After the battles of Iuka and Corinth, Grant began planning for a campaign into central Mississippi and west Tennessee to capture Vicksburg; the last Confederate stronghold on the Mississippi River. In the meantime, companies B and C reinforced A and E-K on December 12, 1862. Company D finally arrived on February 14, 1863. For the first time since mustering into service, all 10 companies of the 5th Minnesota were united on the field. The Army of the Mississippi was transformed into the Army of the Tennessee under Maj. Gen. Ulysses S. Grant. The 5th took place in this army in the II Brigade, III Division, William Tecumseh Sherman's XV Army Corps.

==== Mississippi Springs and Jackson ====
Operations for the Vicksburg campaign began in December, 1862 and eventually it was time to campaign against the city itself. On May 2, 1863, Sherman's XV Corps moved into western Mississippi to secure Grant's position from Confederate General Joseph E. Johnston's army. The 5th Minnesota led the column while deployed as skirmishers. The regiment engaged in sharp fighting with their rebel counterparts all the way to Mississippi Springs near Jackson: Sherman's main objective. On May 13, the Minnesotans skirmished once again all day until the Confederates finally withdrew. On May 14, the 5th maintained its deployment and fought in the Battle of Jackson. Fighting was relatively light, lasting for roughly an hour before Johnston withdrew his forces. Casualties were relatively light on both sides, but the Union army, victorious, rendered much of the city's infrastructure unusable. The 5th then acted as provost guards during the occupation.

==== Assault on Vicksburg, 22 May 1863 ====
On May 21, 1863, preparations for a general assault on Vicksburg were complete. At 10:00 am the next morning, the attacks began. The 5th Minnesota took position on the left of the II brigade, which would attack along Graveyard Road at 3:00 pm with the rest of Tuttle's III division. The II brigade attacked by the right flank as there was not enough space to form into line of battle. The brigade's front suffered severe losses to no avail, but the regiment was saved from said losses thanks to its position on the brigade's left. After being repulsed, the men awaited the cover of night to return to friendly lines.

==== Richmond, Louisiana ====
After performing duty in the siege trenches for several days, the 5th was assigned to an expedition up the Yazoo River. Grant decided that Vicksburg could not be overrun by assault, and settled for a siege. During which he would still need his flanks secured from Johnston's army. The brigade skirmished with the enemy into Satartia and Mechanicsburg on June 4–5. before being ordered into the interior of Louisiana to halt the army of Richard "Dick" Taylor. Confederate General John G. Walker's Greyhounds Division was discovered at Richmond on the 14th and the next day the 5th's brigade along with the Mississippi Marine Brigade attacked the Confederates.

The 5th were deployed as skirmishers as they began returning fire from the 18th Texas Infantry Regiment. The Texans temporarily beat back the Union skirmishers until the 5th had fallen back on their brigade's main line. At this point the Greyhounds were compelled to retreat after the line counterattacked, the Minnesotans once again leading in front. The fight was short and light on casualties, but Richmond was soon taken with 25 prisoners taken by the 2nd brigade.

==== Surrender of Vicksburg ====
The regiment remained in Louisiana until Vicksburg's garrison commander, John C. Pemberton, capitulated on July 4, 1863, with the entire remaining garrison of 29,495 men. The surrender coincided with the Union victory at Gettysburg the previous day. The Minnesotans could finally rest, recruit and continue smaller operations along the Mississippi River into 1864.

=== Veteran Volunteers ===
Come February 12, 1864, the three-year enlistments had expired for the regiment. However, the majority of the men re-enlisted and the regiment was veteranized by order of the War Department. Col. Hubbard held command of the 5th's brigade while immediate command of the regiment fell to Lieutenant Colonel William Gere. The 5th Minnesota was promptly reassigned to the II brigade, I division, XVI Army Corps under the command of Andrew J. Smith in time for the Red River Campaign.

=== Red River campaign ===
On March 10, 1864, the 5th Minnesota embarked with the XVI Corps of General Nathaniel P. Banks' Army of the Gulf. The expedition's main objective was to capture Shreveport, a major Confederate port city in Louisiana, and destroy the forces in the area under General Edmund Kirby Smith.

==== Fort DeRussy ====
As A.J Smith's corps disembarked, they set to work against Fort DeRussy, one of the outposts guarding the entrance to the Red River. The fort was garrisoned by 350 men and 10 heavy cannon. On March 14, Smith's command invested and assaulted the battery. The 5th Minnesota took part in the charge that caused the rebel gun crews to surrender.

==== Henderson's Hill ====
After the capture of Fort DeRussy, the 5th took part in clearing the countryside of Confederate forces. On reconnaissance to Henderson's Hill near Boyce, Louisiana, the 5th Minnesota aided in an ambush that resulted in the capture a battery of four cannon and 250 men On the 26th, movement up the Red River valley commenced.

==== Pleasant Hill ====
Come April, General Banks engaged in battle with Dick Taylor at Mansfield on April 8, 1864, and was soundly defeated. A.J Smith's XVI Corps arrived from Grand Ecore to reinforce Banks that night. The next day Taylor attacked the Union lines in the Battle of Pleasant Hill, but was repulsed. The 5th Minnesota was only lightly engaged, and was missing just one man by battle's end. Though a Union tactical victory, the campaign as a whole would remain a decisive failure. The regiment continued to skirmish along the retreat route at Moore's Plantation and Bayous Robert and La Moure. The regiment further built their reputation as effective skirmishers at the Battles of Mansura and Bayou La Glaise.

=== Action at Lake Chicot and furlough ===
The regiment returned to Vicksburg on May 24, 1864, after the expedition closed. The 5th Minnesota was granted 30 days of furlough from veteranizing and embarked up the Mississippi on June 4 as part of the Lake Village expedition. On the way, Confederate General John S. Marmaduke had a battery posted near Lake Chicot and Greenfield, Arkansas. Not wishing to let the rebels get in the way of furlough, the restive soldiers of the 5th landed and overran the battery on June 6. Afterwards, the regiment continued to St. Paul, Minnesota and began their brief return home. The action at Lake Chicot is remembered as part of the Battle of Old River Lake.

=== Tupelo and Abbeville ===
While the re-enlisted veterans went north, the non-veterans under the command Capt. Timothy J. Sheehan fought in the Battle of Tupelo on July 14–15, 1864. The non-veterans' performance was regarded well but in little detail. Confederate Generals Nathan Bedford Forrest and Stephen D. Lee were defeated. On August 7, the veterans returned to the front and reached A.J Smith's XVI Corps near Holly Springs on the Tallahatchie River. A small action was fought against raiding rebel cavalry on the river near Abbeville, Mississippi, in which the 5th Minnesota captured some prisoners.

=== Sterling Price's Missouri expedition ===
From August 29 - December 2, 1864, the 5th Minnesota marched hundreds of miles in the chase of Sterling Price's Army of Missouri through Arkansas, Missouri, Kansas, and the Indian Territory. Conditions during the expedition were severe for the Union army, as Col. Hubbard described in the regiment's narrative:

This was, all things considered, the hardest campaign it [the regiment] made during the war. The route lay through almost impenetrable cypress swamps and over unused mountain roads, washed by continuous rains down to their rocky beds. Severe storms prevailed much of the time, and the men often lay down at night, drenched, sore, weary and hungry, feeling that they would never be able to rise to their feet again. It was developed after the command had been out several days that its supply train was loaded with moldy and decayed hard bread, refuse stores issued by the commissary at Little Rock. In consequence of this the army was early put upon half-rations, then one-third, and much of that unfit to eat. The men became nearly starved, and driven to that extreme that they sought for nourishment in the bark of sassafras boughs and beech leaves, which the forest trees afforded. The country was largely uninhabited, and hence afforded nothing upon which an army could subsist.

Nonetheless, the 5th took part in the pursuit of Price after the Battle of Westport. Despite the wretched condition of the regiment and the XVI corps, Price's expedition proved to be a failure for the Confederacy. The 5th reached St. Louis on November 15 and quartered in Benton Barracks.

=== Nashville ===
==== Arrival at Nashville ====
On November 30, 1864 the regiment, refitted and reinforced, reported to Maj. Gen. George H. Thomas commanding the Army of the Cumberland at Nashville, Tennessee. The regiment then took a new place in the II brigade, I division as part of a detachment Army of the Tennessee now commanded by Maj. Gen. Andrew Jackson Smith. Confederate General John Bell Hood led the rebel Army of Tennessee to defeat at Franklin the same day the 5th reported to Nashville, but Hood still remained hopeful to capture Nashville itself.

===== December 15 =====
By December 14, Hood had invested Nashville in a defensive position on high-ground, with an attack from Thomas delayed by harsh weather. On this day, however, the army received orders to advance the next day. On the 15th, the I division and the 5th Minnesota were then ordered to capture two redoubts on the Confederate left. The men advanced under a severe barrage of musketry and grape shot from these fortifications, but the Minnesotans kept their pace. The infantry and artillerymen who garrisoned the forts panicked and fled. The Minnesotans pursued, but were halted by artillery fire from the rebel guns on higher ground. The 5th spent the night with little sleep and the battle would continue the next day.

===== December 16 =====
On December 16, the I division's brigades were replenished and plans were made. The 5th, supported by their comrades, were to advance across open ground and seize the Confederate breastworks atop Shy's Hill. At 4:00 pm the general advance began. As the plan set in motion, the regiment took fire almost immediately as they stood up. As the advance continued many of the regiment's color bearers fell either dead or wounded. The fire was indiscriminate and Col. Hubbard's horse was shot from underneath him. Despite severe losses, the II brigade and the 5th reached the breastworks. During the combat, Lt. Thomas P. Gere captured the regimental flag of the 4th Mississippi. Overall, the 5th Minnesota suffered 106 casualties in the Battle of Nashville. Other elements of the Union army supported the effort; Hood's terror-stricken army nearly disintegrated in the retreat. Along with the 5th Minnesota, the 7th, 9th and 10th Minnesota regiments, all in the I division of A.J Smith's army, fought in relatively close proximity that day. The conduct of the Minnesota regiments was noted in the St. Paul Press by J.P Owens:

The hour arrives four o clock precisely by McArthur's time. The order goes forth, and with a shout that is heard plainly away off in our old lines near Nashville seven miles the division starts for the works before it. The Second Brigade leads off. Colonel Hubbard, with hat in hand, waving it over his head, leads on his trusty warriors. He knows what is coming, but he also knows the men he leads. Across the cornfield, the soft ground giving away un til men and horses sink at every step knee- deep; under a shower of canister, shell and Minie-balls filling every inch of the atmosphere and meeting them square in the face, they keep onward. The -works are gained; no faltering yet; and now goes up the flag of the Ninth Minnesota on the works; simultaneously with it the flag of the veteran Fifth which has been shot down four times in this advance and riddled with a full charge of canister ascends; the works are carried in front of all the brigades of the division, and Minnesota holds the position in an unbroken line of half a mile in extent. Prisoners commence passing to the rear. First comes Capt. McGrew of the Fifth, a staff officer of Col. Hubbard's, with about a regiment of them; then we meet officers and enlisted men of all the regiments with squads larger than they can be supposed to take care of in all, the captures amounting to at least as many men as there were in the Second Brigade. The whole work a work that all military men who witnessed it agree in pronouncing a charge of scarcely equaled brilliancy in the annals of warfare was accomplished in ten minutes time. The enemy was completely routed and driven to the adjacent hills in utter confusion. Ten pieces of artillery of the first quality were captured, in addition to small arms and prisoners without number. Of the ten pieces four were taken by the Second Brigade. Minnesota gained more glory than the war had previously allowed her to gain. The gallantry of her officers and men is the theme of all tongues and pens.

On January 10, 1865, the veteran 5th Minnesota reached Eastport, Mississippi, and spent the month there.

=== Mobile campaign ===
On February 6, 1865, the 5th's XVI corps reached Dauphin Island near Mobile Bay in preparation of General Edward Canby's campaign to capture the port of Mobile, Alabama. If captured, the Union army's advance into Alabama would go unimpeded. The capture of the two main forts defending the city: Spanish Fort and Fort Blakeley were the keys to Mobile's capitulation.

==== Spanish Fort ====
The 5th Minnesota and the II brigade constructed the second parallel and thus were closest to the entry of Spanish Fort than any other approach. On April 7, commotion was heard by the Union soldiers from inside the fort. Curious soldiers investigated the next day and found the place abandoned. While losses were suffered in the siege, the capture itself was bloodless.

==== Fort Blakeley ====
A.J Smith's column reinforced the efforts to take Fort Blakeley, but the 5th Minnesota was only able to lightly support the endeavor on the assault of April 9. Though the defenders fought, they were heavily outnumbered. Fort Blakely fell the same day and on April 12, 1865, Mobile capitulated. This was the last campaign of the 5th Minnesota Infantry.

=== End of service ===
When Fort Blakely fell on April 9, 1865, Confederate Gen. Robert E. Lee surrendered his Army of Northern Virginia to Gen. Ulysses S. Grant and the Army of the Potomac. Confederate forces everywhere followed, and the war was over. The 5th Minnesota remained in service into the summer at Demopolis, Alabama. The 5th was finally mustered out on September 6 and reached Fort Snelling where they were finally discharged on September 22, 1865.

== Casualties ==
The 5th Minnesota Infantry suffered a total of 4 officers and 86 enlisted men killed in action or who later died of their wounds, plus another 4 officers and 175 enlisted men who died of disease, for a total of 269 fatalities.

== Colonels ==
- Colonel Rudolph von Borgesrode - April 30, 1862, to August 31, 1862.
- Colonel Lucius Frederick Hubbard - August 31, 1862, to September 6, 1865.

== Notable people ==
- Thomas P. Gere, first lieutenant, Medal of Honor recipient
- John Ireland, Chaplain and Archbishop of St. Paul, Minnesota
- Timothy J. Sheehan, the first lieutenant in charge of Fort Ridgely during the Battle of Fort Ridgely. Sheehan was later promoted to the rank of Captain and commanded Company C until 1865 when he was breveted with the rank of Lieutenant colonel. Sheehan was later worked for the United States Marshals Service and was present at the Battle of Sugar Point in 1898.
- Vincent P. Kennedy, surgeon's assistant and later surgeon for the regiment. Kennedy was a Minnesota physician and politician who served in the Minnesota House of Representatives.

== See also ==
- List of Minnesota Civil War Units
- Minnesota in the American Civil War
