= Thomas P. Gere =

Union Army officer (1842–1912)

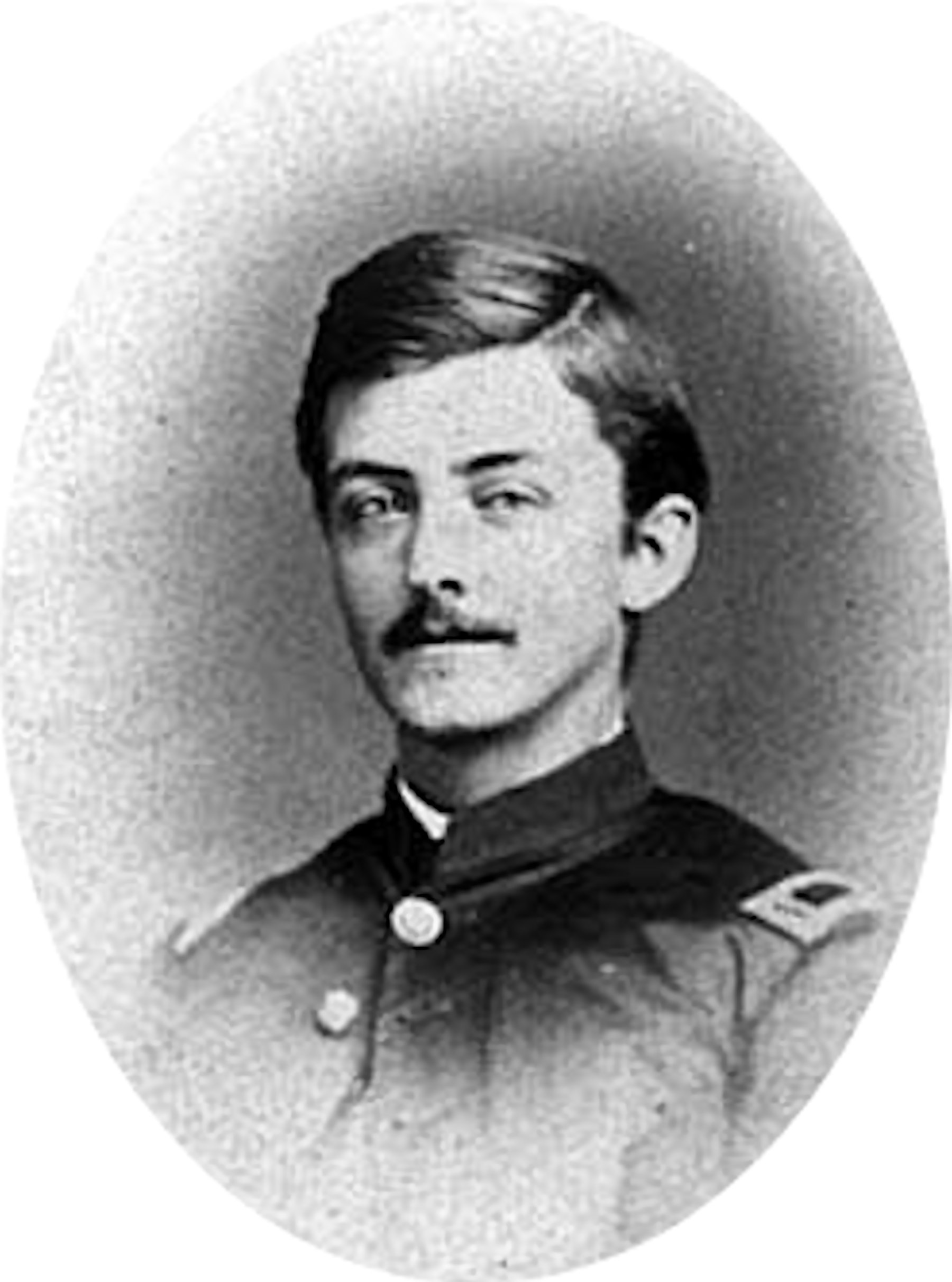
- Medal of Honor recipient Thomas Parke Gere
- Born: December 10, 1842; Wellsburg, New York, US
- Died: January 8, 1912 (aged 69)
- Burial place: Arlington National Cemetery, Arlington County, Virginia
- Military career
- Allegiance: United States of America
- Branch: United States Army; Union Army
- Service years: 1862–1865
- Rank: First lieutenant
- Unit: 5th Minnesota Volunteer Infantry Regiment
- Conflicts: American Civil War
- Awards: Medal of Honor

Thomas Parke Gere (December 10, 1842 – January 8, 1912) was a Union Army officer who received the Medal of Honor for his actions during the Battle of Nashville in the American Civil War.

== Biography ==
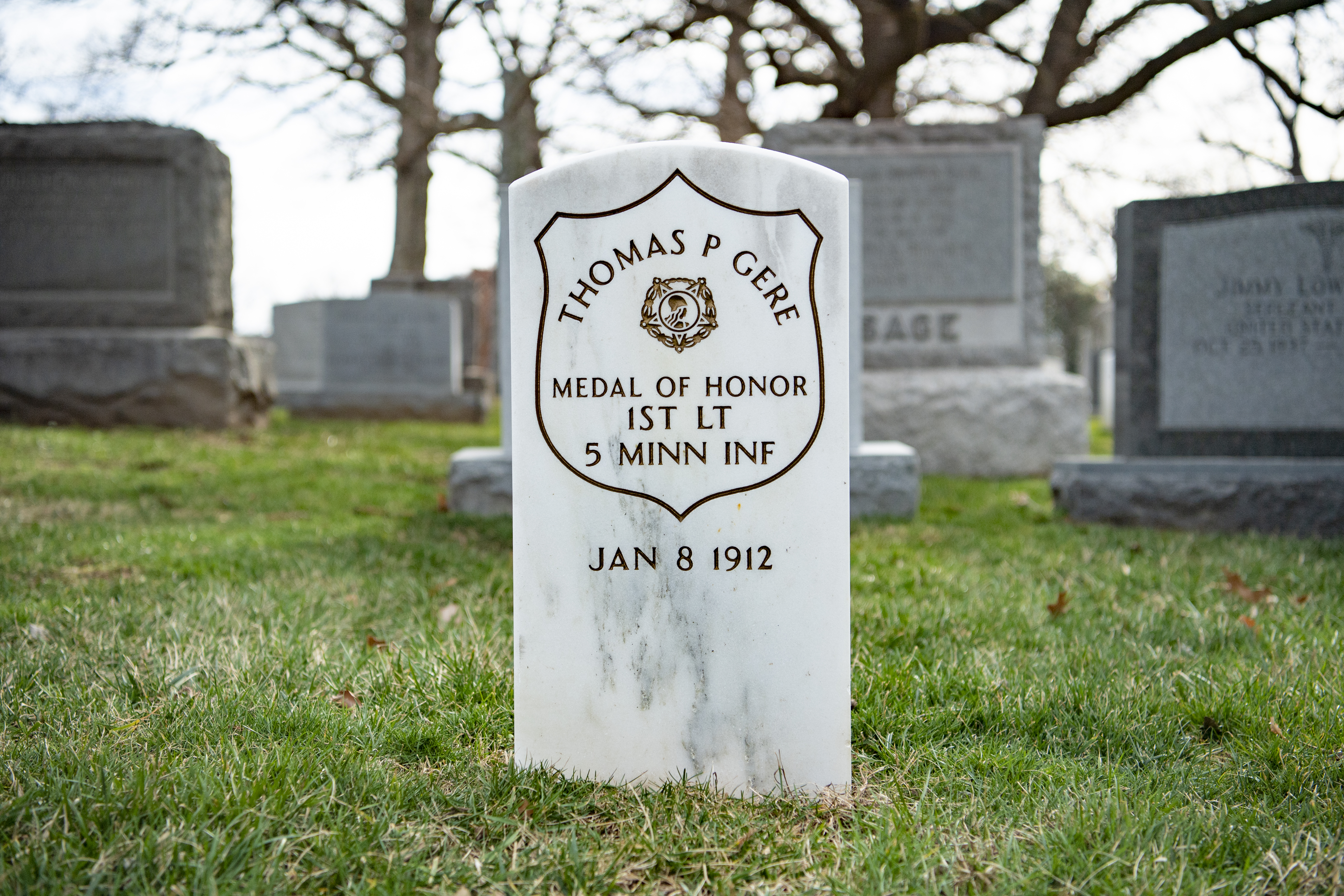
Grave at Arlington National Cemetery

He was born December 10, 1842, in Wellsburg, New York. He enlisted in the 5th Minnesota Volunteer Infantry Regiment at age 19, mustering in on January 17, 1862, at Fort Snelling. He was promoted first sergeant on March 5, 1862, and to second lieutenant on March 24, 1862, and posted to Fort Ridgely as a member of B Company. He and a few men were on duty at the Lower Sioux Agency at the out break of the Sioux Uprising of 1862. His commander died at the Battle of Redwood Ferry which made him the senior officer of the garrison. He was the fort commander only until C Company returned and 1st Lt Sheehan relieved him. He was later promoted to first lieutenant and then became adjutant.

In late 1862 his regiment moved to Mississippi where it took part in the capture of the cities of Jackson and Vicksburg. In April 1864 he fought with his regiment at the Battle of Pleasant Hill in Louisiana. In December 1864 the regiment participated in the siege of Nashville, Tennessee.

He was awarded the Medal of Honor on February 24, 1865, for his actions at the Battle of Nashville, Tennessee, December 16, 1864. He mustered out of service on April 5, 1865.

After the war, Gere became a railroad surveyor and later an executive with different railroads. He served as superintendent of the Chicago, St. Paul, Minneapolis and Omaha Railroad, and later was president of the Sioux City and Northern Railroad. He later founded the National Linseed Oil Company.

Lieutenant Gere was a companion of the Iowa Commandery of the Military Order of the Loyal Legion of the United States.

== Personal life ==
Gere married Florence Howard in 1868. They had a child who died in 1870 and Florence died of tuberculosis about a year later. In 1874, he married Mary Emma Sheppard, and they had three children together.

== Death ==
He died January 8, 1912, and was buried at Arlington National Cemetery, Arlington, Virginia, where his grave can be found in section 1, lot 361.

== Medal of Honor citation ==
Rank and organization: First Lieutenant and Adjutant, 5th Minnesota Infantry. Place and date: At Nashville, Tenn., 16 December 1864. Entered service at: ------. Birth: Chemung County, N.Y. Date of issue: 24 February 1865.

Citation:

Capture of flag of 4th Mississippi (C.S.A.).

== See also ==
- List of Medal of Honor recipients
- List of American Civil War Medal of Honor recipients: G–L
