= Fort Ridgely =

Frontier U.S. Army outpost in present-day Nicollet County, Minnesota (1851–67)

- U.S. National Register of Historic Places
- U.S. Historic district
- Minnesota State Register of Historic Places
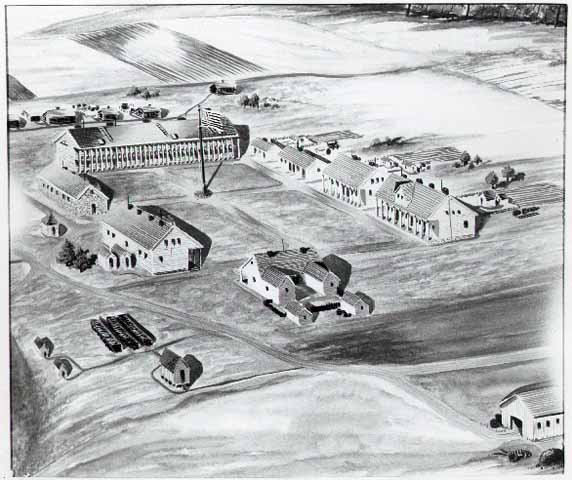
- Fort Ridgely in 1862

- Location within Minnesota Location within the United States
- Location: Nicollet County, south of Fairfax, Minnesota
- Coordinates: 44°27′3″N 94°43′54″W
- Built: 1853
- Architectural style: unpallisaded frontier fort
- NRHP reference No.: 70000304
- Added to NRHP: December 02, 1970

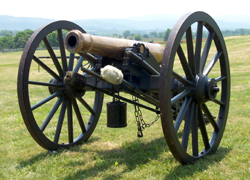
1841 smoothbore 6-pounder. None of the Fort Ridgely artillery remain on site.

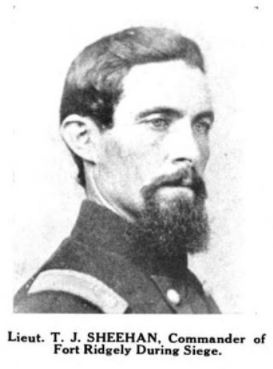
Lt. T. J. Sheehan commander C Company 5th Minnesota Infantry posted to Fort Ripley. He was sent to Fort Ridgley to assist administration duties at the Upper Sioux Agency for B Company. He assumed command of the fort after Ridgely's commander died at Redwood Ferry.

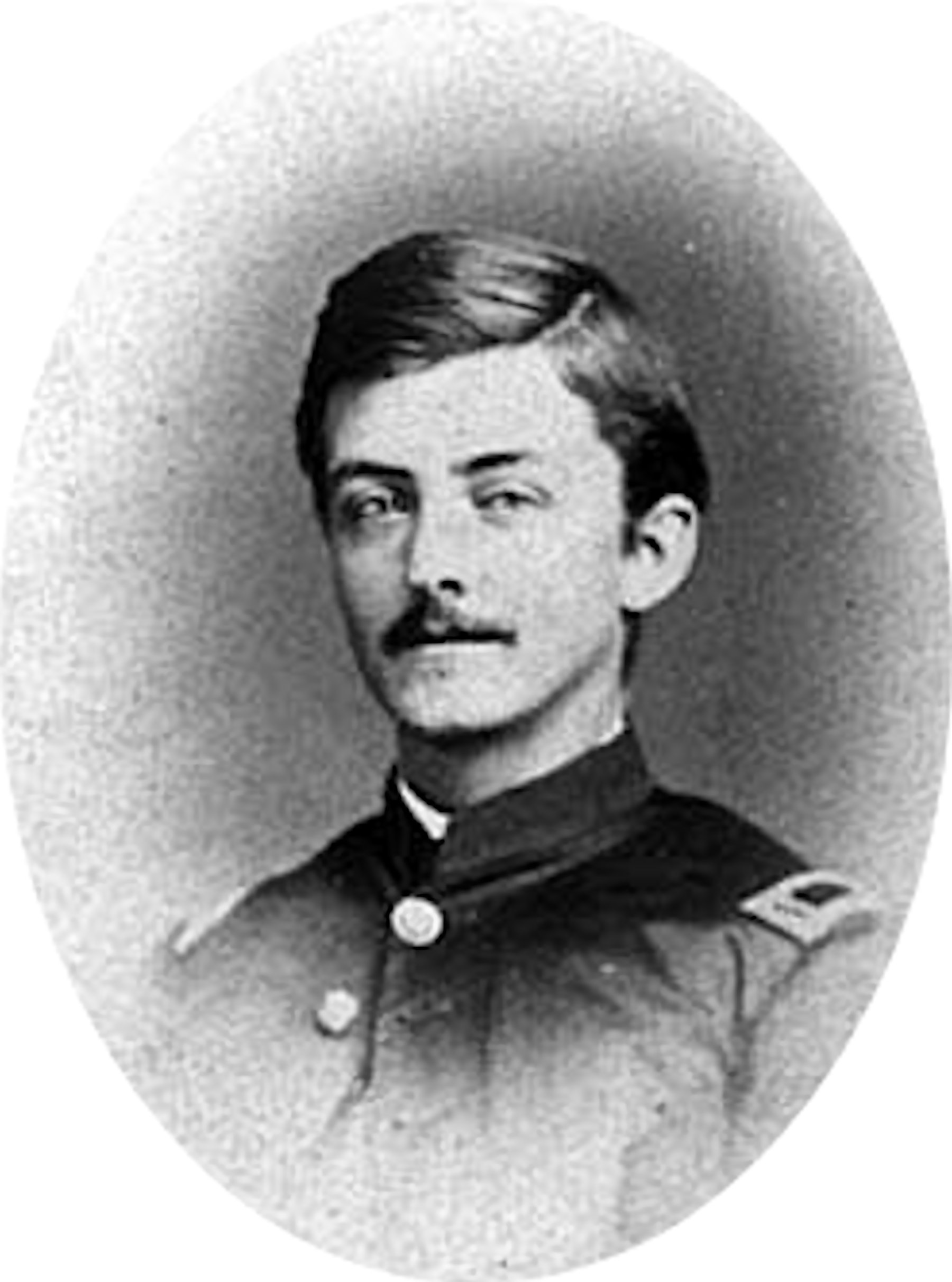
2nd Lt. Gere was at the Lower Sioux Agency when hostilities broke. He became senior officer of the garrison when the fort commander died. Lt. Sheenhan relieved him by rank upon his return to Fort Ridgely to aid the fort's defence. Lt. Gere would receive a Medal of Honor for later actions.

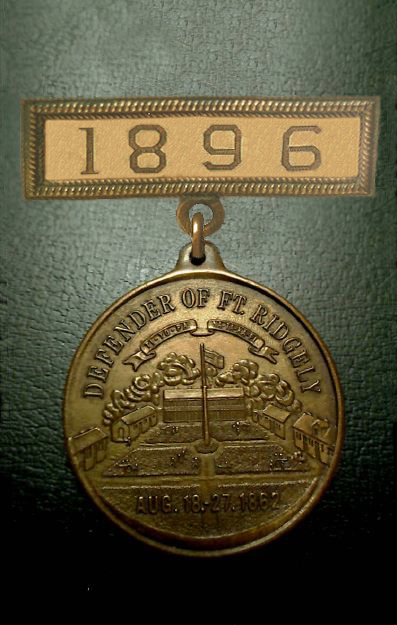
Fort Ridgely Defenders Medal awarded at the dedication of the Fort Ridgely monument in 1896. Big Eagle's quote: "Ti-Yo-Pa Na-Ta-Ka-Pi" or "They Kept the Door Shut" is above the Fort.

Fort Ridgely was a frontier United States Army outpost from 1851 to 1867, built 1853–1854 in Minnesota Territory. The Sioux called it Esa Tonka. It was located overlooking the Minnesota River southwest of Fairfax, Minnesota. Half of the fort's land was part of the south reservation in the Minnesota River valley for the Mdewakanton and Wahpekute tribes. Fort Ridgely had no defensive wall, palisade, or guard towers. The Army referred to the fort as the "New Post on the Upper Minnesota" until it was named for two Maryland Army Officers named Ridgely (Randolph and Lott Henderson), who died during the Mexican–American War. (Many sources also cite Captain Thomas P. Ridgely as a namesake, but he died at a residence in Baltimore.)

== History ==
=== Construction ===
The War Department hired Mr. Jessie H. Pomeroy of St. Paul to build both Fort Ridgely and Fort Ripley. At Ridgely there were two Companies of troops that assisted in quarrying the granite two miles away and transporting it to the site, and the erection of a 400-man stone barracks. The barracks formed the east side of the 90-square-yard parade ground of the wall-less fort.

In 1854–55, Congress approved $10,000 for the clearing of timber on a military road from St. Anthony Falls to Fort Ridgely. On July 22, 1856, Congress approved another $50,000 to build a wagon road from Fort Ridgely to South Pass, Nebraska Territory. William H. Nobles was appointed superintendent of the road's construction. He encountered problems receiving disbursements to cover the basic labor costs incurred.

On March 8, 1857, the Spirit Lake Massacre took place in Iowa. Fort Ridgely sent troops commanded by Captain Bee to investigate. They found that Inkpaduta and his band had departed, but Lt. Murray and 25 men were left to search while Capt. Bee and the others returned to Fort Ridgely. The sole survivor was a 14 year old named Abbie Gardner who was made a prisoner for four months. On March 26 the band made a raid on Springfield, Minnesota and according to Abbie, Lt. Murray and his men came into sight two days later, unaware how close they came to encountering the band. Two Wahpeton bargained for the Government for her release and took her to the Upper Sioux Agency. From there she was moved to the Fort Ridgely where she was put on a riverboat to St. Paul.

=== Sioux Uprising ===
The fort played an important role in the Dakota War of 1862. It would go into American West history as the only fort to come under attack as it experienced. On August 18 Captain Marsh, the fort commander, took most of the garrison to the Lower Sioux Agency upon receiving reports that the Agency had been attacked. Marsh and his men came under attack when they stopped for water, in what would become known as the Battle of Redwood Ferry. Earlier in August Capt. Marsh had requested assistance from C Company at Fort Ripley to oversee the annuity and provisions exchange at the Upper Sioux Agency. Fort Ripley's executive officer, 1st Lt. Sheehan, brought two Mountain Howitzers and 40 men to do the job. Initially, Indian Agent Thomas Galbraith refused to extend credit to the Sissiton and Whapeton. However, after a heated exchange Lt. Sheehan with his howitzers convinced all parties that an orderly distribution of food was best. With that done and thinking their task was completed, C Company departed for their own post the morning that the lower Agency was overrun. Unbeknownst to Sheehan, Galbraith had refused to extend credit to the Mdewakanton and Wahpekute at the Lower Sioux Agency. B Company did not have the same military force presence at the Lower Sioux Agency and the situation there spiraled out of control.

When Capt. Marsh learned of the outbreak he sent a runner to catch up with C Company for their support. Lt. Sheehan and his men were near Glencoe, Minnesota, about 40 miles distance, when they were caught up with. Sheehan marched his men through the night making it back to Ridgely by noon that day. Their reinforcement of the garrison changed the Fort's defense as it had more firepower than it could use with eight artillery pieces. When 2nd Lt. Gere learned of Capt. March's death he sent a Private William Sturgis to inform Fort Snelling. Sturgis rode through the night covering the 125 miles in eighteen hours. The Sioux attacked Ridgely's combined military/civilian force twice, on August 20 and August 22. B and C Companies of the 5th Minnesota together with militia and settlers of the Minnesota River valley totaling 230 were opposed by 800 Mdewakanton and Wahpekute led by Little Crow. Some of the civilians were native Métis members of the Renville Rangers militia that had been in the process of departing for Fort Snelling to enlist in a Minnesota Volunteer Infantry unit. Private Sturgis gave them the word they were needed at Fort Ridgely. Fort artillery is credited with repulsing the overwhelming force. Ordinance Sergeant John Jones was the sole regular Army at the fort. He is credited with Ridgely's successful defense by organizing men with artillery experience to man three cannons, two 12-pounders and the 24-pounder. With all the caissons available, while one was servicing a gun position another was restocked and readied to immediately replace it when it was depleted. This allowed the guns to be fired non-stop when needed. C Company remained at the fort until after Col. Sibley arrived with the 6th Minnesota, Companies A, B, F, G 7th Minnesota, Company A 9th Minnesota and Companies G & I 10th Minnesota. With dead laying all over the frontier, Sibley dispatched 170 men as burial parties. Two of those burial parties met and bivouacked 16 miles from Fort Ridgely. On Sept 2nd they were ambushed in the Battle of Birch Coulee. Lt. Sheehan and his men were part of the relief force. Afterwards Sibley ordered them back to Fort Ripley to get their garrison back to strength with the frontier in turmoil.

On 4 September the 3rd Minnesota arrived back at Fort Snelling and joined Sibley at Fort Ridgely on the 12th.

As the war against the Sioux expanded, three Companies of the 30th Wisconsin Infantry Regiment later transitioned Fort Ridgely and New Ulm en route to Fort Wadsworth (Sisseton). For a period a battery of the 3rd Minnesota light Artillery was posted to the fort. Sergeant Jones resigned from the U.S. Army for a Captain's commission in the 3rd Minn. Artillery. Postwar Capt. Jones served one term as the Chief of the St. Paul Police Department.

The Companies of the 7th Minnesota would garrison the Fort next, followed by the 2nd Minnesota Cavalry, Becketts Cavalry, and a Company of the 1st U.S. Volunteers. They were Confederate prisoners of war that had been sworn into federal service.

In March 1863 General Sibley ordered a general court martial be convened at Fort Ridgely on the March 18. The accused was a Lt. George V. Mayhew. The charges were not identified, but were written by his commanding officer Captain Libby of Libby's Company.

=== 1864 wagon train ===
On July 15, 1864, Capt. James L. Fisk of the Quartermaster Corps lead 97 wagons of pioneers out of Fort Ridgely to meet Gen. Sulley at Fort Rice for escort to the gold fields in Montana Territory. Gen.Sulley departed early, so Fort Rice provided a 40-man escort. On September 2, one hundred eighty miles west, the train ran into Sitting bull's warriors. The wagon train made a 300' diameter defense of sod that was named Fort Dilts. General Sully organized a rescue expedition consisting of 300 men 30th Wisconsin, 200 8th Minnesota, 100 7th Iowa Cavalry(dismounted) and 100 each from the 2nd Minnesota Cavalry, Brackett's Battalion and the 6th Iowa Cavalry. The Minnesota units rendezvous at Fort Ridgely to head west and rescued the outpost on the 20th. However, a wagon of poisoned food was left by Minnesotans that had lost family in the 1862 uprising. Upon reaching Fort Rice the wagon expedition disbanded.

=== 1865 Abandonment of the post ===
In 1865-6 Captain Kellogg, Commander of Fort Ridgley, formed three settlements of friendly Sioux before the Lake Traverse Reservation was created. The first was directly west of Fort Ridgely at Lake Hendricks on the Minnesota-Dakota Territory border. The other two were southeast of Lake Hendricks at Lake Titaukhe, and Lake Thompson.

In June 1865 the 10th Infantry returned to Fort Snelling and Companies B and H were posted to Fort Ridgely. The Army abandoned Fort Ridgely in 1867 and posted the garrison to Fort Wadsworth (Sisseton). Civilians occupied the vacant buildings and later dismantled them for the building materials. In 1863 one of the 6-pounders from the fort was given to the New Ulm Battery by General Sibley.

=== State recognition ===
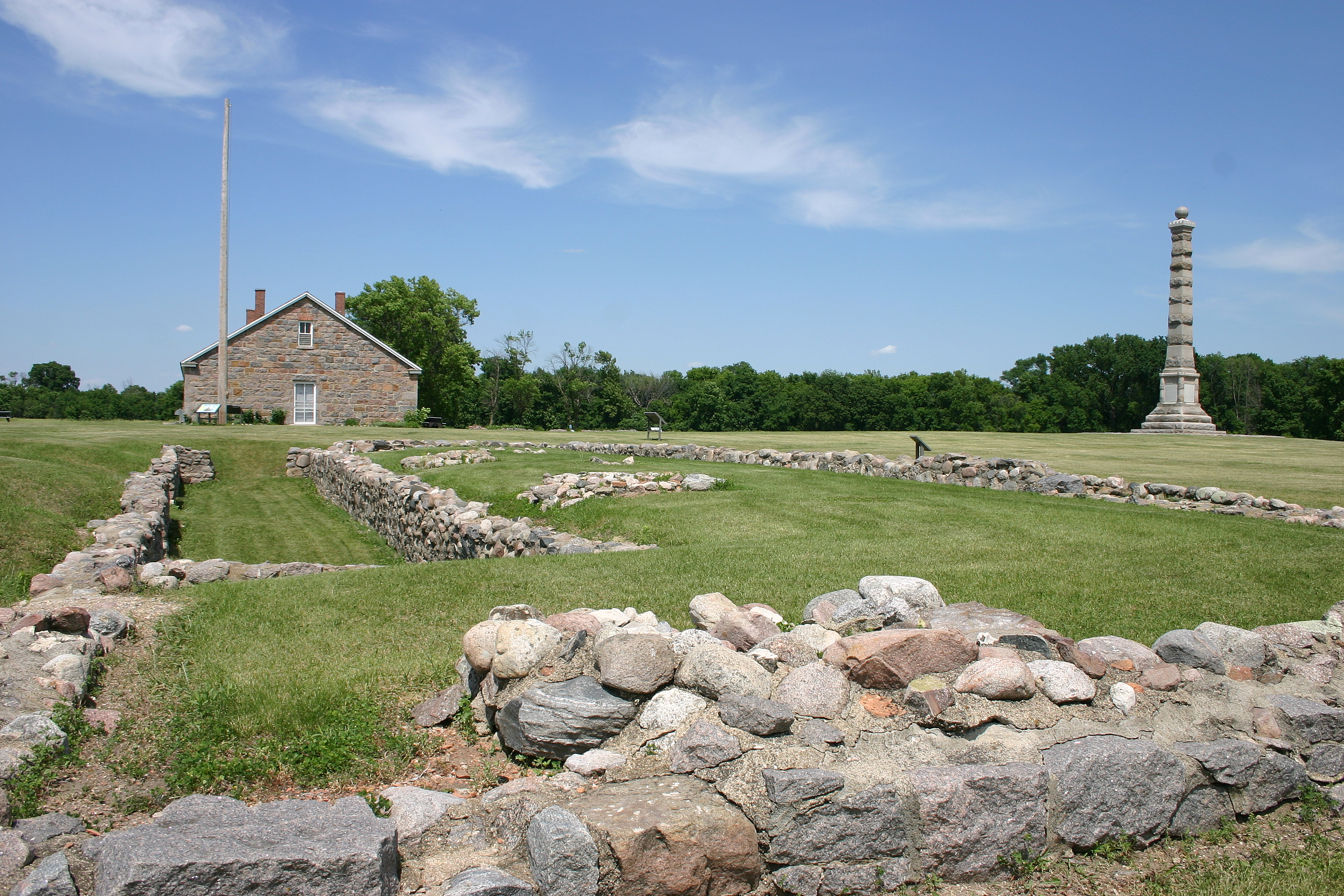
The foundation remains of the forts's original buildings at Fort Ridgely, Minnesota with the 1896 monument at the right

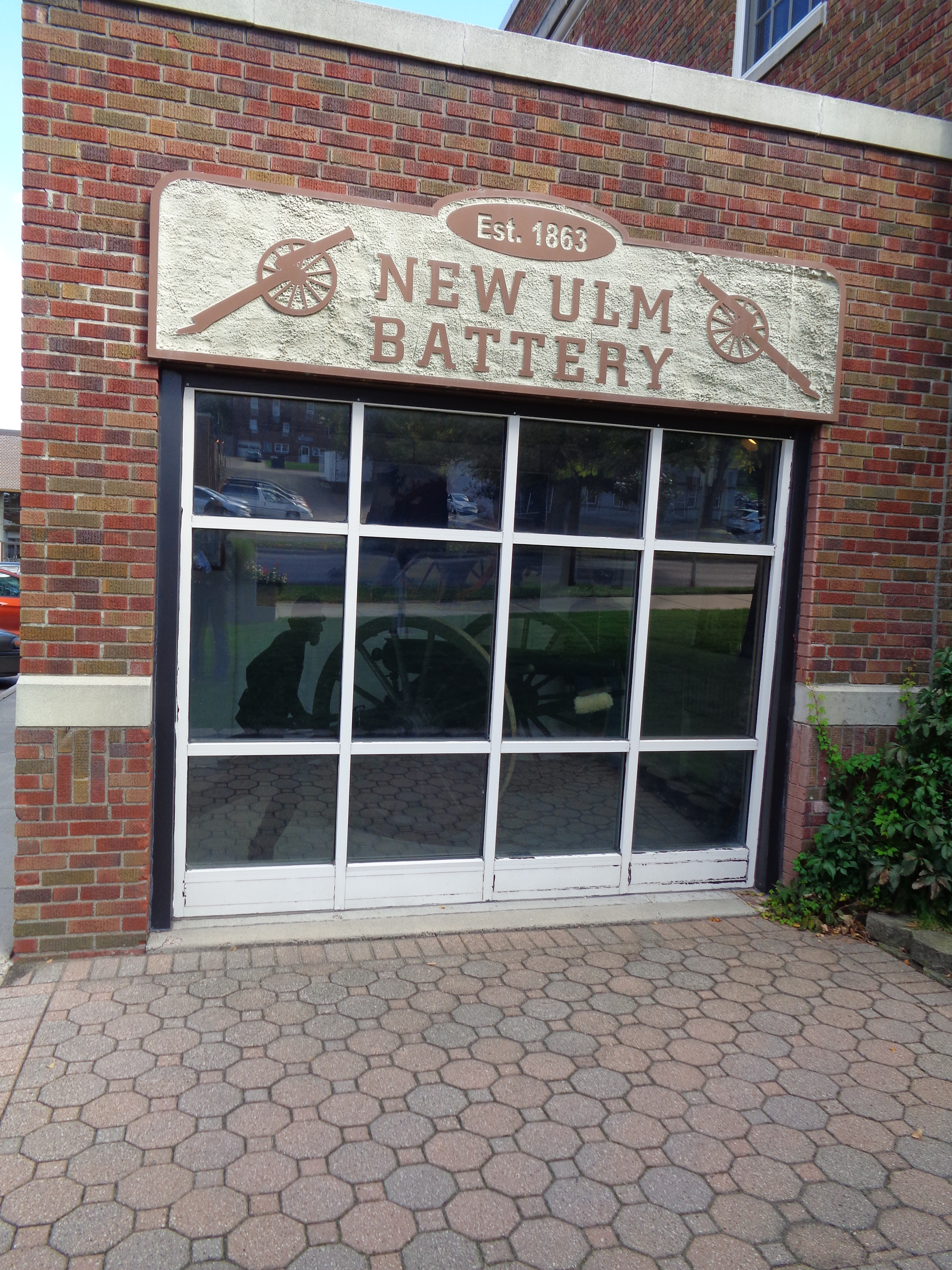
Fort Ridgely 6-pounder given by Col. Sibley to the New Ulm Battery on display at New Ulm Minnesota city hall .

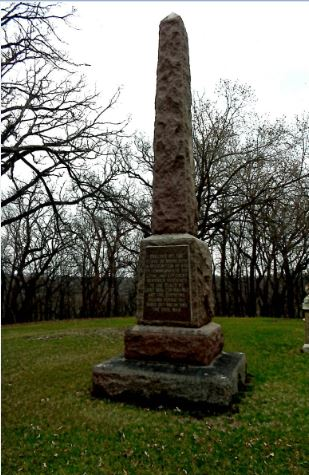
Chief Mou-Zoo-Mau-Nee sent 300 warriors to aid in the defense of Fort Ripley if needed during the Sioux outbreak. The monument to the Mille Lacs band was dedicated in 1914 at the Fort Ridgely site because the public came there while the Fort Ripley site was abandoned and unused. The monument is the same size as the one the State put up for the men of the 5th Minnesota that died at Ridgely.

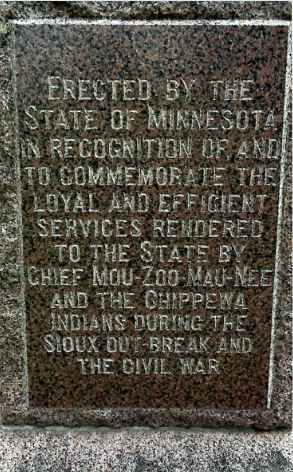
Dedication to Chief Mou-Zoo-Mau-Nee and the Mille Lacs band.

In 1895 the Minnesota legislature authorized $3,000, roughly $102,000.00 in 2020 dollars, for the construction of a monument to the Minnesota citizens who had defended the fort. On 20 August 1896 the granite structure was dedicated with many of the surviving defenders attending. Werner Boesch, the ex-Swiss artilleryman that had helped man a 12-pounder during the attacks, had a Fort Ridgely Defender Medal made for the occasion. On it he quoted Big Eagle's comment about the Fort: "Ti-Yo-Pa Na-Ta-Ka-Pi" or they "Kept the Door Shut" to the lower Minnesota river valley. The reverse reads: Presented by the State of Minnesota.

The State erected another large monument to the Chief Mou-zoo-mau-nee and the Mille Lacs Band of Ojibwe in 1914. Chief Mou-zoo-mau-nee sent 300 warriors to the Fort Ripley to augment in its defense during the uprising. The State held a large dedication and the Milles Lacs band sent a delegation to represent the band.

In June 1918 the 6th Battalion of Minnesota Home Guard was mustered into the State National Guard with A Company at Fairfax. Fort Ridgely was used as an encampment site by A Company.

== Site of the fort today ==
Today the building foundations have been exposed by State archeologists. The Minnesota Historical Society maintains the publicly owned portion within Fort Ridgely State Park. The old commissary building (partially reconstructed by the Civilian Conservation Corps in the 1930s) now houses the Park's museum. Fort Ridgely was added to the National Register of Historic Places in 1970, with much of the park added in 1989.

== Notable Officers posted to Fort Ridgely ==
Notable officers posted to Fort Ridgely included:

- Major Samuel Woods (6th U.S. Infantry), first post commander 1852–53, would become a Lt. Colonel and paymaster of the Department of Dakota.
- Major George W. Patten, post commander twice, 1856 and 1861. Lost a hand at the Battle of Cerro Gordo, Mexico and became a Lt. Colonel.
- Lt. Alfred Sulley 1855 made Major General by end of Indian Wars.
- Lt. John C. Kelton (6th U.S. Infantry) 1852 would become the Adjunct General United States Army
- Lt. Winfield Scott Hancock 1853 would become a Major General and commander of the Department of Dakota
- Lt. Henry E. Maynadier (10th U.S. Infantry) 1856–57, became a brevet Major General
- Lt. Frederick Steele 1854, became a Major General
- Capt. John J. Abercrombie 1854, also served at Fort Ripley and established Fort Abercrombie. Became a Brigadier General.
- Colonel Edmund Brooke Alexander, post commander, 10th U.S. Infantry 1857 would become a brevet Brigadier General
- Major Thomas W. Sherman (3rd U.S. Artillery) at post when the post was made the Artillery School for Practice Fort Ridgely. He was there 1858–1861 except while commander of an expedition to Kettle Lake in Dakota Territory in 1859. He would become a brevet Major General
- Major William W. Morris (4th U.S. Artillery) at post 1861 became a brevet Major General
- Capt. John S. Marsh replaced Major Morris and was killed in action at Redwood ferry 1862, (B Co. 5th Minnesota Infantry)
- 2nd Lt. Thomas P. Gere (B Co. 5th Minnesota) assumed command when Capt. Marsh was killed. He received the Medal of Honor at the Battle of Nashville
- 1st Lt. Timothy J. Sheehan assumed post command from 2nd Lt. Gere 1862 (C Co. 5th Minnesota Infantry) wounded twice defending the post, made Lt. Colonel by end of Civil War, wounded 2 twice more
- Major John Parker post commander, 1st Minnesota Mounted Rangers
- Major E.A.Hatch, was at the Battle of Fort Ridgely as a civilian hired by the Northern Superintendency of Indian Affairs to accompany the annuity payment from St Paul. He would be enlisted as a Major in 1863 and made commander of the 1st Minnesota Indian Volunteer Regiment better known as Hatch's Battalion.
- Capt. Barnard Bee became Brigadier General CSA and is credited with giving Stonewall Jackson his nickname at the First Battle of Bullrun, where he was killed in action.
- Major J.C. Pemberton post commander 1859–61 became a CSA Lt. General and would surrender to Ulysses Grant at Vicksburg.
- Lt. Lewis A. Armistead post commander (6th Infantry), became a CSA Lt. General
- Corporal Daniel W. Burke(Companies B & E 2nd U.S. Infantry) 1858–59 would become Brigadier General. He received the Medal of Honor during the Civil War at the Battle of Shepherdstown.
- Capt. James L. Fisk (3rd Minnesota Infantry special assignment Quartermaster Corps) 1863, 64.

== Units assigned to the outpost ==
In its time, numerous units were assigned to the outpost. From the U.S. Army: Companies of the 2nd, 6th, and 10th Infantry Regiments as well as batteries of the 2nd, 3rd, 4th Artillery Regiments, as well as I Co. 1st U.S. Volunteer Regiment.

Until 1859 the garrison was typically three companies of infantry of 30-40 men each. That year the Army designated the fort as an Artillery School for Practice and supplied six pieces of various calibers: two M1841 6-pounder field guns, 12-pounder, M1841 mountain howitzer, 12 pound Napoleon, and M1841 24-pounder howitzer.

From 1857 to 1861, Companies G, I, L 2nd Artillery were variously posted to northern forts: Snelling, Ridgely, and Ripley. In 1859, Companies F and K of the 4th Artillery were posted to the Fort. May 1861 saw E Company 3rd Artillery withdrawn to the east because of the rebellion.

Specifications of the ordnance at the Artillery School:	Description	Caliber	Barrel length	Barrel weight	Carriage weight	Shot weight	Charge weight	Range 5° elev.
M1841 6-pounder cannon	3.67 in (9.3 cm)	60 in (152.4 cm)	884 lb (401 kg)	900 lb (408 kg)	6.1 lb (2.8 kg)	1.25 lb (0.6 kg)	1,523 yd (1,393 m)	
M1841 12-pounder cannon	4.62 in (11.7 cm)	78 in (198.1 cm)	1,757 lb (797 kg)	1,175 lb (533 kg)	12.3 lb (5.6 kg)	2.5 lb (1.1 kg)	1,663 yd (1,521 m)	
M1841 12-pounder howitzer	4.62 in (11.7 cm)	53 in (134.6 cm)	788 lb (357 kg)	900 lb (408 kg)	8.9 lb (4.0 kg)	1.0 lb (0.5 kg)	1,072 yd (980 m)	
M1841 24-pounder howitzer	5.82 in (14.8 cm)	65 in (165.1 cm)	1,318 lb (598 kg)	1,128 lb (512 kg)	18.4 lb (8.3 kg)	2.0 lb (0.9 kg)	1,322 yd (1,209 m)	
M1857 12-pounder Napoleon	4.62 in (11.7 cm)	66 in (167.6 cm)	1,227 lb (557 kg)	1,128 lb (512 kg)	12.3 lb (5.6 kg)	2.5 lb (1.1 kg)	1,619 yd (1,480 m)	

During the civil war Companies from Minnesota Volunteer Regiments served in place of the regular army. These included the 1st, 2nd, 4th, 5th, 6th, 8th, 9th, and 10th regiments, 2nd Cavalry, 1st Mounted Rangers, Brackett's Cavalry and a battery from the 3rd light artillery.

== See also ==
- Lower Sioux Agency
- Battle of Redwood Ferry
- Battle of Birch Coulee
- Battles of New Ulm
- Battle of Wood Lake
- Slaughter Slough
- Surrender at Camp Release
