= 2nd Minnesota Cavalry Regiment =

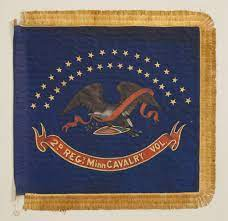
- Battle Flag of the 2nd Minnesota Volunteer Cavalry Regiment
- Active: December 5, 1863, to May 4, 1866
- Country: United States
- Allegiance: Union Army
- Branch: Cavalry
- Engagements: Sully's Expedition (1863–1864); Battle of Killdeer Mountain; Battle of the Badlands; Rescue of James L. Fisk's Emigrant train at Fort Dilts

Commanders
- Colonel: Robert Neil MacLaren
- Lieutenant Colonel: William Pfaender
- Major: Ebenezer Alonzo Rice

The 2nd Minnesota Cavalry Regiment was a Minnesota USV cavalry regiment that served in the Union Army during the American Civil War.

The 2nd Minnesota Cavalry Regiment was mustered at Fort Snelling, Minnesota. for three year's service on December 5, 1863, and were mustered out on November 17, 1865, and May 4, 1866. It served entirely in Minnesota, Dakota Territory, and Montana Territory guarding the frontier against the Sioux Indians. In 1864 the 2nd Minnesota Cavalry was headquartered at Fort Snelling under Colonel Robert Neil MacLaren.

== Service history ==
Organized in Saint Paul, Minnesota at Fort Snelling on December 5, 1863, to January 5, 1864. Duty there and garrison posts on Minnesota frontier till May, 1864. March to Fort Ridgely May 24–28, 1864. Sully's Expedition against hostile Indians west of the Missouri River June 5 to October 15, 1864. March to Fort Sully, Missouri River, June 5 – July 1. Pursuit of Indians to the Badlands July 5–28. Battle of Tah kah a kuty or Battle of Killdeer Mountain July 28. Passage of the Bad Lands August 348. Action at Two Hills, Bad Lands, Little Missouri River, August 8–9. Rescue of James L. Fisk's Emigrant train September 10–30. Engaged in frontier and patrol duty between Forts Wadsworth, Abercrombie, Ripley and Ridgley, Headquarters at Fort Snelling, till May, 1866. Mustered out Companies "B," "C," "D," "E," "F," "G," "I" and "M" November 17 to December 29, 1865, Company "A" April 2, 1866, Company "H" April 28, 1866, and Companies "K" and "L" May 4, 1866.

== Battles and campaigns ==
- Battle of Tah Kah A Kuty or Battle of Killdeer Mountain, July 28, 1864.
- Battle of the Badlands, August 8 to 9, 1864.
- Rescue of Fisk's Emigrant train at Fort Dilts, September 10 to 30,1864.

== Colonels ==
- Colonel Robert Neil MacLaren - January 13, 1864 - November 17, 1865.

== Casualties and total strength ==
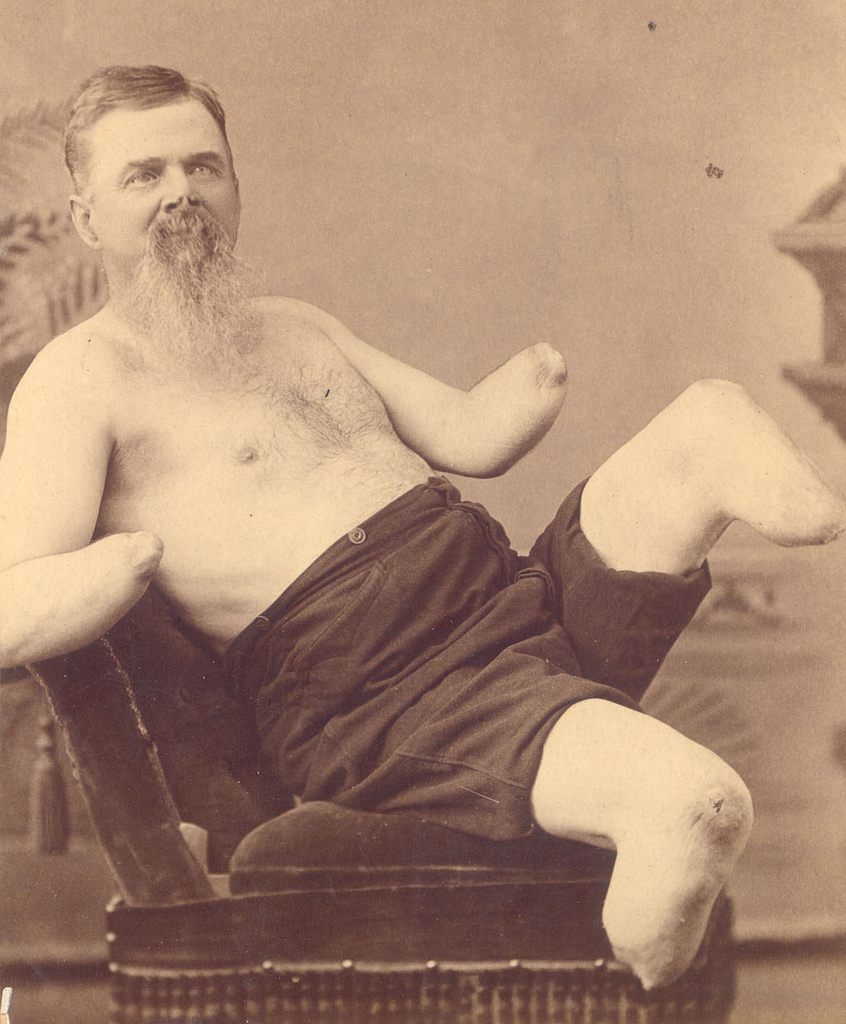
Private Benjamin Franklin, Company K, 2nd Regiment, Minnesota, Cavalry, who lost all four limbs to frostbite, December, 1865.

The 2nd Minnesota Cavalry had 4 enlisted men killed in action or died of wounds received in battle and an additional 3 officers and 56 enlisted men died of disease. Total fatalities were 63.

== War Poet ==
At the outbreak of the American Civil War, Edward Thomas, a Welsh-language war poet native to Centerville, Ohio and whose Bardic name was Awenydd, was living and working as a schoolmaster at the Welsh-American farming settlement at South Bend Township, in Blue Earth County, Minnesota. In 1862, he enlisted in Company E of the 2nd Minnesota Cavalry Regiment. During his military service, Thomas wrote many Welsh language poems, including Pryddest ar Wir Fawredd, which later won the Bardic Crown at an Eisteddfod held in Minersville, Pennsylvania. Following the end of the war, Thomas became a Presbyterian minister.

== Notable people ==
- Robert Neil MacLaren: MacLaren (sometimes spelled McLaren) started out his career as the Major of the 6th Minnesota Infantry Regiment. MacLaren was present at the Battle of Birch Coulee and the Battle of Wood Lake. MacLaren was eventually was promoted to the rank of Colonel and given the command of the 2nd Minnesota Volunteer Cavalry on January 12, 1864. In 1865 MacLaren served as the commandant of Fort Snelling and was present for the execution of Chief Shakopee III. He was later brevetted with the rank of Brigadier General in December of 1865.
- Edward Thomas: a Welsh-language war poet, served in Company E.
- Jacob Nix: Nix was a supporter of the German revolutions of 1848–1849 and was an active Turner. Nix settled in New Ulm, Minnesota and took part in the Battles of New Ulm as a militia Captain before being enrolled as the Captain Company L, 1st Minnesota Cavalry Regiment and later transferred to Company G, 2nd Minnesota Cavalry. Nix was discharged on November 4, 1864.
- William Pfaender: Mayor, postmaster, and State Representative from New Ulm, Minnesota. Pfaender first served as the Lieutenant colonel of the 1st Minnesota Cavalry Regiment under Colonel Samuel McPhail from October 1862 to November 1863 before transferring to the 2nd Minnesota Cavalry Regiment.
- Benjamin Franklin: Franklin was a Private in Companies H & K of the 2nd Minnesota Cavalry. While travelling from Fort Wadsworth in Dakota Territory, to Fort Ridgley in Minnesota he and several others were caught in a blizzard which caused the entire party to suffer from frostbite. Both of Franklins arms and legs required amputation and made him a quadruple amputee. His likeness can be found on many Carte de visite held in both private collections, as well the collections of both the National Museum of Health and Medicine and the National Museum of Civil War Medicine.
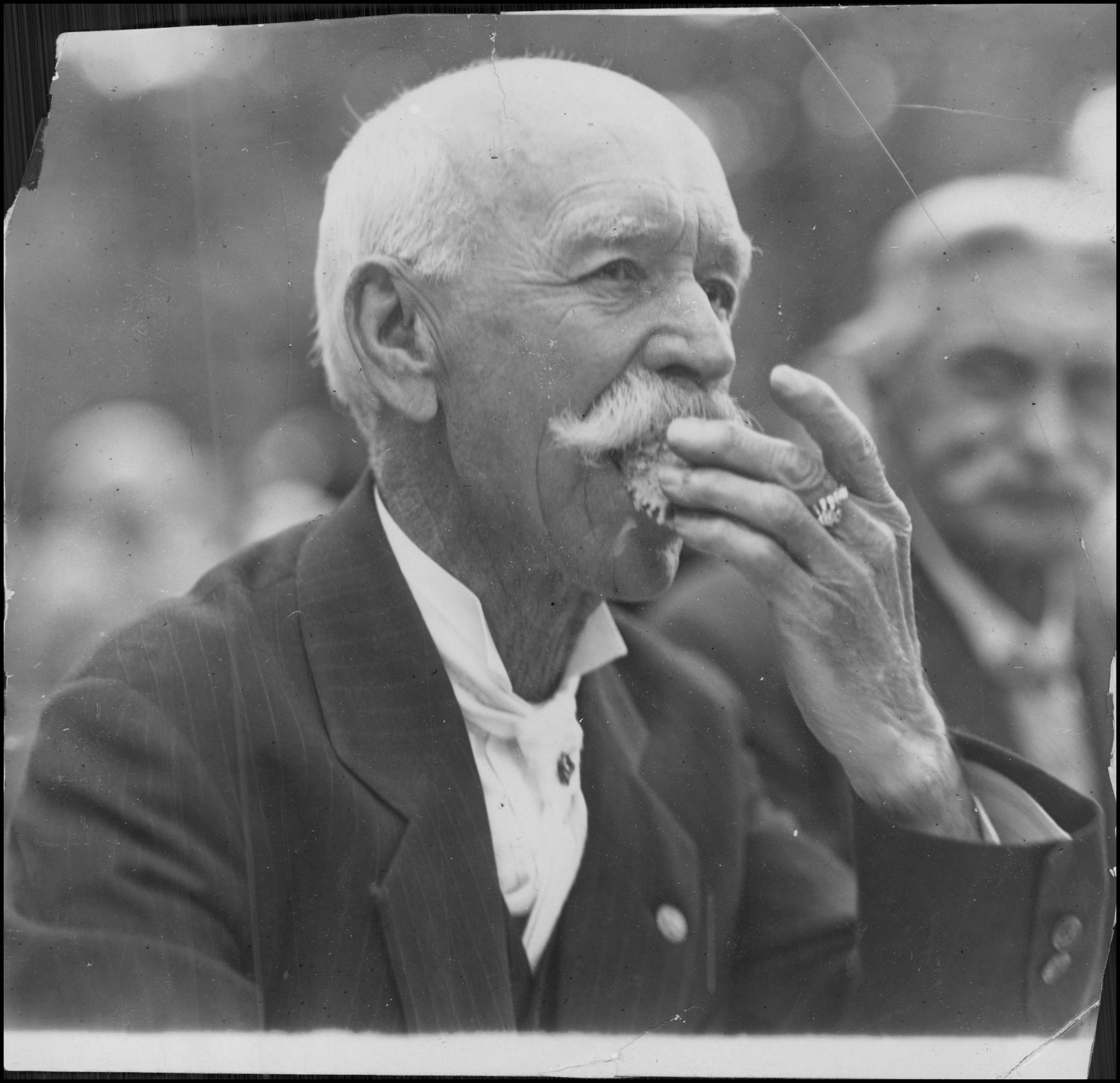
  "Colonel" Peter F. Dubay during a reunion of Minnesota Civil War Veterans. Dubay served as a Bugler for Company G of the 2nd Minnesota Cavalry Regiment. Hennepin County Library.

== See also ==
List of Minnesota Civil War Units
