= Hauenstein Brewing Company =

American brewing company in Minnesota

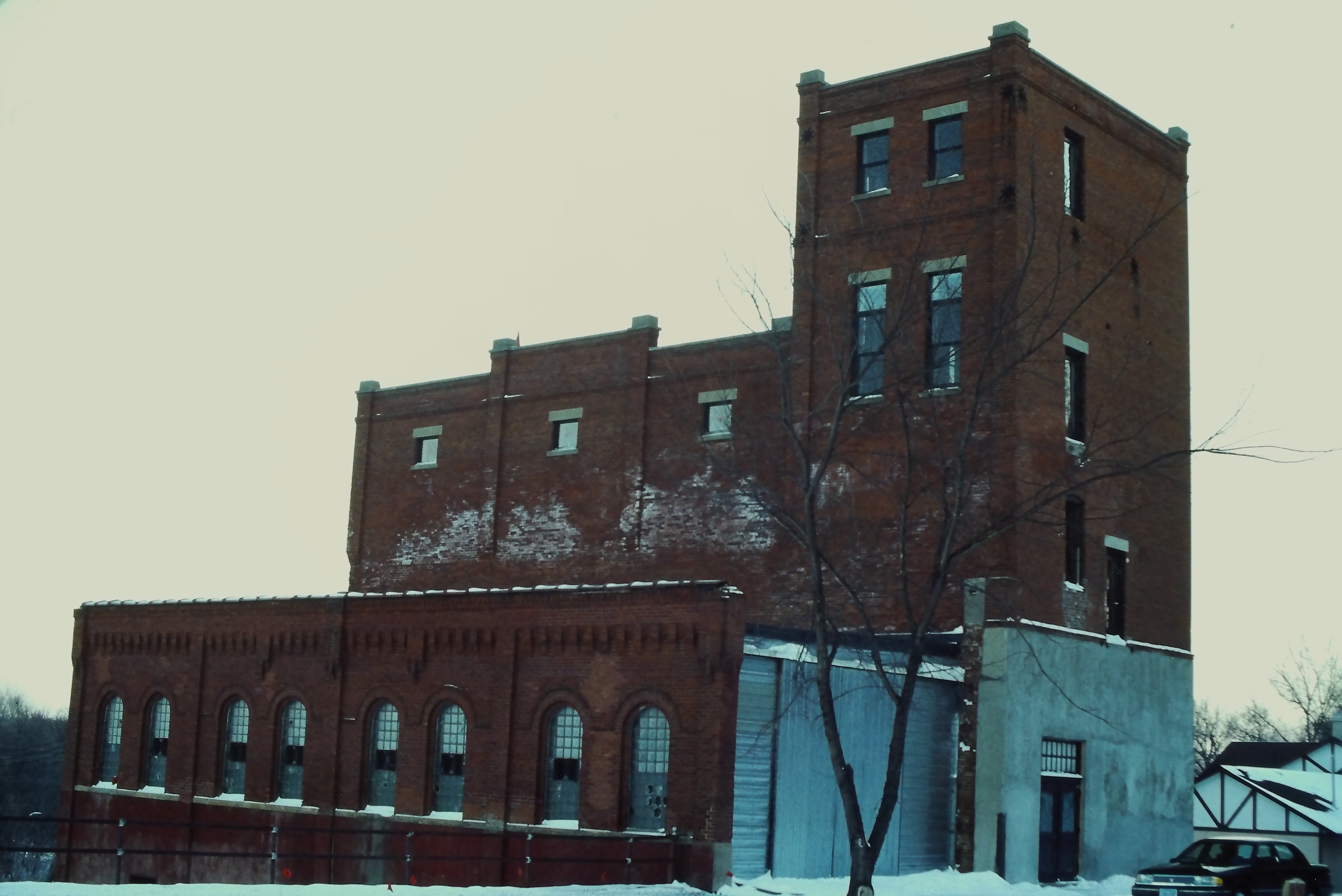
- The Hauenstein Brewing Company Factory located in New Ulm, Minnesota.
- Location: New Ulm, Minnesota 1604 Hauenstein Dr.
- Opened: 1864
- Key people: John Hauenstein
- Other products: 1919 Root Beer
- Owner: Arneson Distributing Company; August Schell Brewing Company
- Website: www.hauensteinbeer.com

Active beers
Name	Type
Hauenstein's American Lager	Lager

Inactive beers
Name	Type
Hauenstein's New Ulm Strong Beer	Strong beer
Hauenstein's Bock Beer	Bock
Hauenstein's Ulmer Lager	Lager

The Hauenstein Brewing Company is a brewing company in New Ulm, Minnesota, that was founded by German immigrant John Hauenstein Sr. in 1864. Up until the company's closing in 1972 the Hauenstein Brewing Company was one of the leading distributors of beer in southern Minnesota alongside the August Schell Brewing Company. Second only to Schell's it is one of the oldest brewing companies still operational in Minnesota.

== The Hauenstein Family ==
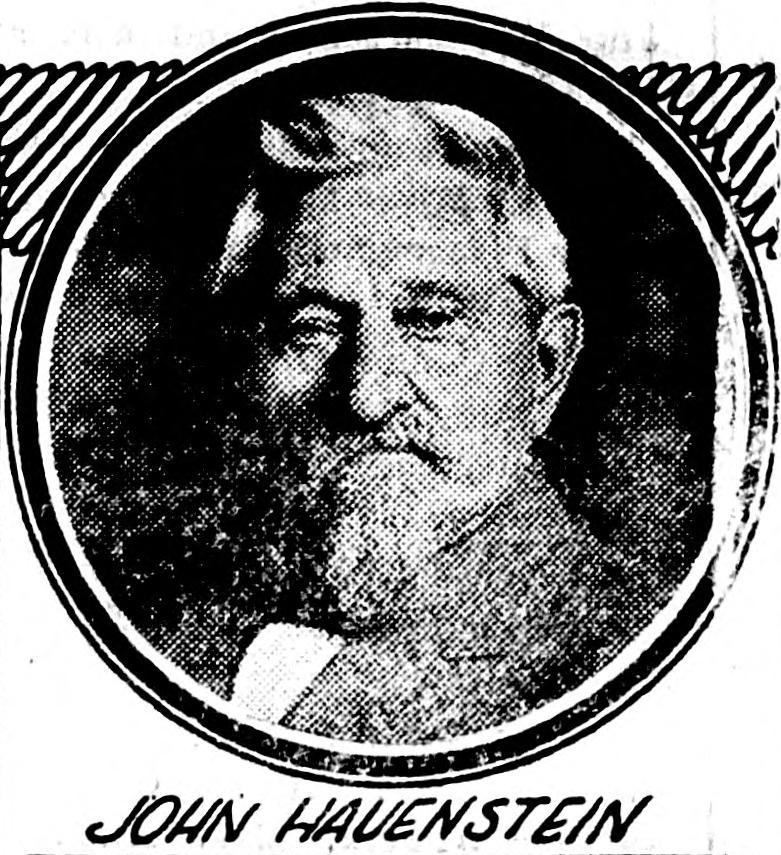
John Hauenstein c.1912

John Hausentein (December 22, 1831 - April 15, 1914) emigrated to the United States from Aufseß, Bavaria with his family in 1852 and settled in Cincinnati which had a large German Quarter. From 1856 to 1858, as part of a larger movement of German immigrants, Hauenstein relocated to the growing city of New Ulm, Minnesota. Once in New Ulm, Hauenstein continued his family's trade as a cooper. Hauenstein married Henrietta Fritsche of Saxony, whose father was the mayor of New Ulm. Together they had two sons and five daughters.

When the Dakota War of 1862 occurred, Hauenstein was still working as a cooper in New Ulm. Hauenstein enlisted in the local militia force of "Mounted Rangers" which skirmished with the Dakota at Milford Township and later fought in the Battles of New Ulm under the command of Charles Eugene Flandrau. Hauenstein later enlisted as a Second Lieutenant in Jacob Nix's Company L of the 1st Minnesota Cavalry Regiment and served in the Union Army until the end of 1863. Hauenstein was a member of the Hecker Post #048 of the Grand Army of the Republic, a member of the Ancient Order of United Workmen, the local Turnverein, and the Sons of Hermann. Hauenstein was also a promoter and treasurer of the building committee for the Hermann Heights Monument.

John Hauenstein operated a brewery from 1864 until his death in 1914. The primary beers produced were strong beer, lager, and bock. After his death on April 15, 1914 at his home in New Ulm, John Hauenstein Senior left the business in the care of his two sons John Hauenstein Jr. (1876-1950) and Charles G. Hauenstein (1857-1932) who succeeded him as Brewmasters.

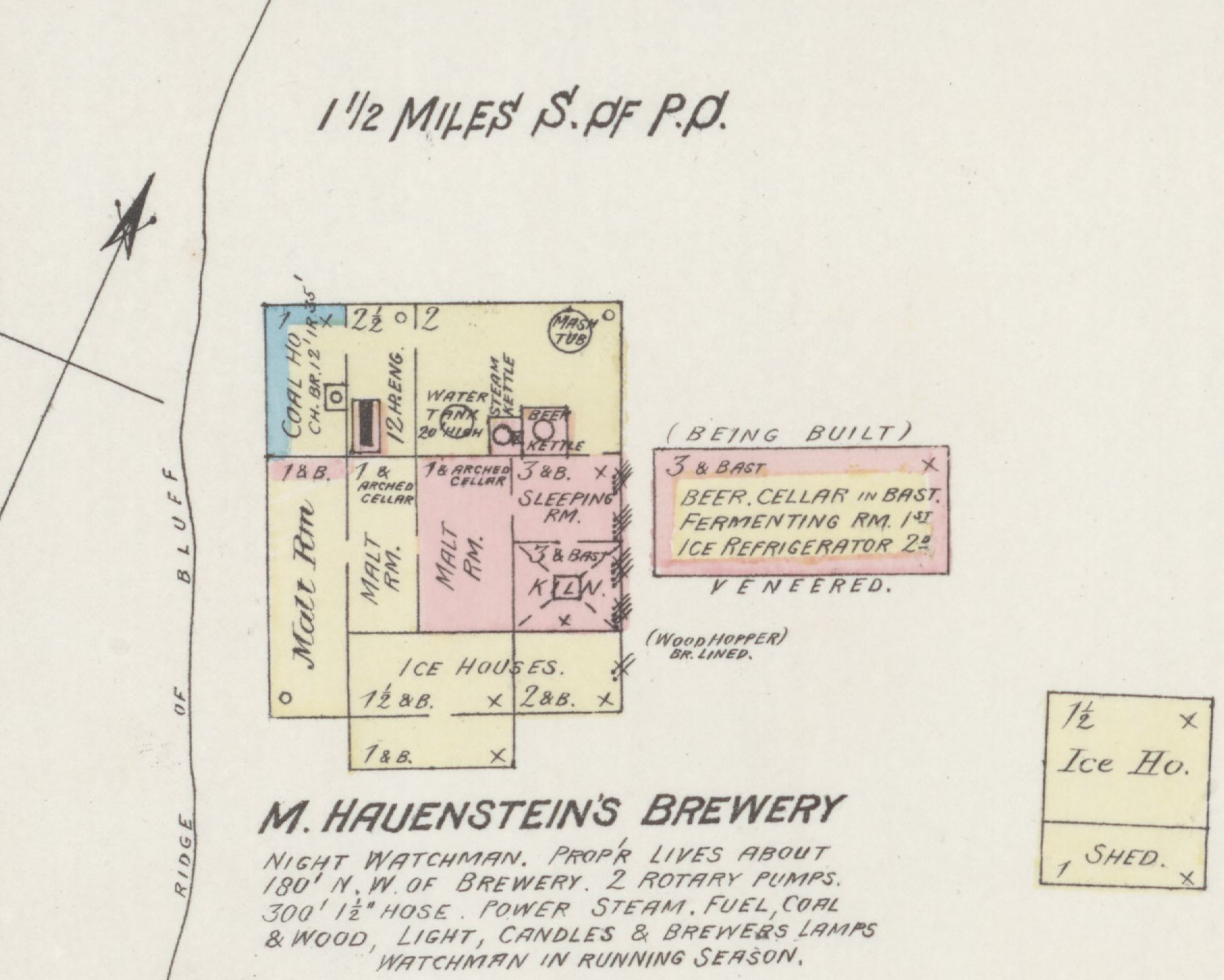
The Hauenstein Brewery in 1884 on the Sanborn Fire Insurance Map from New Ulm, Brown County, Minnesota. Library of Congress.

== The Hauenstein Brewing Company ==
In 1864 Hauenstein partnered with a local New Ulm citizen Andreas (Andrew) Betz and created the John Hauenstein & Betz Brewery (Brewery ID: MN 124a). The brewery started off as a simple homebrewing operation at Hauenstein's home on Franklin Street in New Ulm, but quickly turned into a business for the two men. A formal wooden brewery was completed in 1865 which is where the current grounds of the Hauenstein Brewing Company are still located at 1604 Hauenstein Drive in New Ulm.

The Hauenstein-Betz partnership lasted from 1864 to 1867 when Hauenstein partnered with John C. Toberer, another prominent citizen, and renamed the company to the Hauenstein & Toberer Brewery (MN 124b). The Hauenstein-Toberer partnership did not last long so Hauenstein took ownership of the company and named it the John Hauenstein Brewery (MN 124c) which was its name from 1869 to 1900. The wooden brewery was destroyed by a tornado in 1880 and replaced by a clay and brick brewery which was finished the following year. By 1889 the brewery had 12 employees and produced 6,000 barrels of beer per year with $6,000 worth of taxes for revenue stamps ($1 per barrel). The capacity of the brewery was roughly 50 barrels per day four days per week and it utilized roughly 20,000 bushels of barley each year.

The brewery was formally incorporated in 1900 as the John Hauenstein Brewing Co. (MN 124d), with much of the Hauenstein family sitting on its Board of Directors. In 1910 a portion of the brewery was destroyed during a collapse which caused almost $30,000 in damages. It is believed that this collapse was due to a nearby blast in a quarry just two miles away. Around 2,000 barrels of beer, valued at $12,000, were destroyed during the collapse. The estimated damage to the building was $15,000 to 20,000. By 1915 the brewery had 36 employees, 30 workers in the brewery and bottling house and 6 office workers.

During the ban on alcohol from 1920 to 1933 the two largest breweries in New Ulm at the time were the August Schell Brewing Company and the Hauenstein brewery. Both companies survived Prohibition, but were severely weakened due to almost a decade of reduced capital which primarily came from their sales in both beer and distilled spirits. After the passing of the Twenty-first Amendment to the United States Constitution which repealed the 1919 ban on alcohol the brewery was allowed to operate again. In 1934 the brewery's name was changed for the fifth and final time to the John Hauenstein Co. Brewery (MN 124e); this name would remain until the sale of the company in 1972.

The Hausentein Brewing Company was sold to the Grain Belt Brewery in 1972 due to changes in the beer industry in Minnesota. According to author Robin Shepard, "After Prohibition the Minnesota brewing industry followed national trends. Initially many smalltown breweries tried to come back during the 1930s, but by the end of World War II the age of brewery mechanization fueled mergers and consolidation. Few breweries except for the largest could compete with aggressive industry trends. Many of the once mighty breweries—including Hamm’s, Grain Belt, Montgomery, Hauenstein, Mankato, and Fitger’s—closed or sold off their most popular brands in the late 1960s and 1970s".

The Hauenstein and Grain Belt labels were eventually sold to the G. Heileman Brewing Company of La Crosse, Wisconsin. In 1996, the Hauenstein and Grain Belt labels were purchased by Al and Rae Ann Arneson of the Arneson Distributing Company of Sleepy Eye, Minnesota, a distributor of local beverages including 1919 Root Beer and Buddy's Sodas. Since 1997, the Arneson Distributing Company, partnered with the August Schell Brewing Company, has been producing the original lager from Hauenstein's recipe and are the current owners and operators of the Hauenstein label.

== Old Hauenstein Brewery Building ==
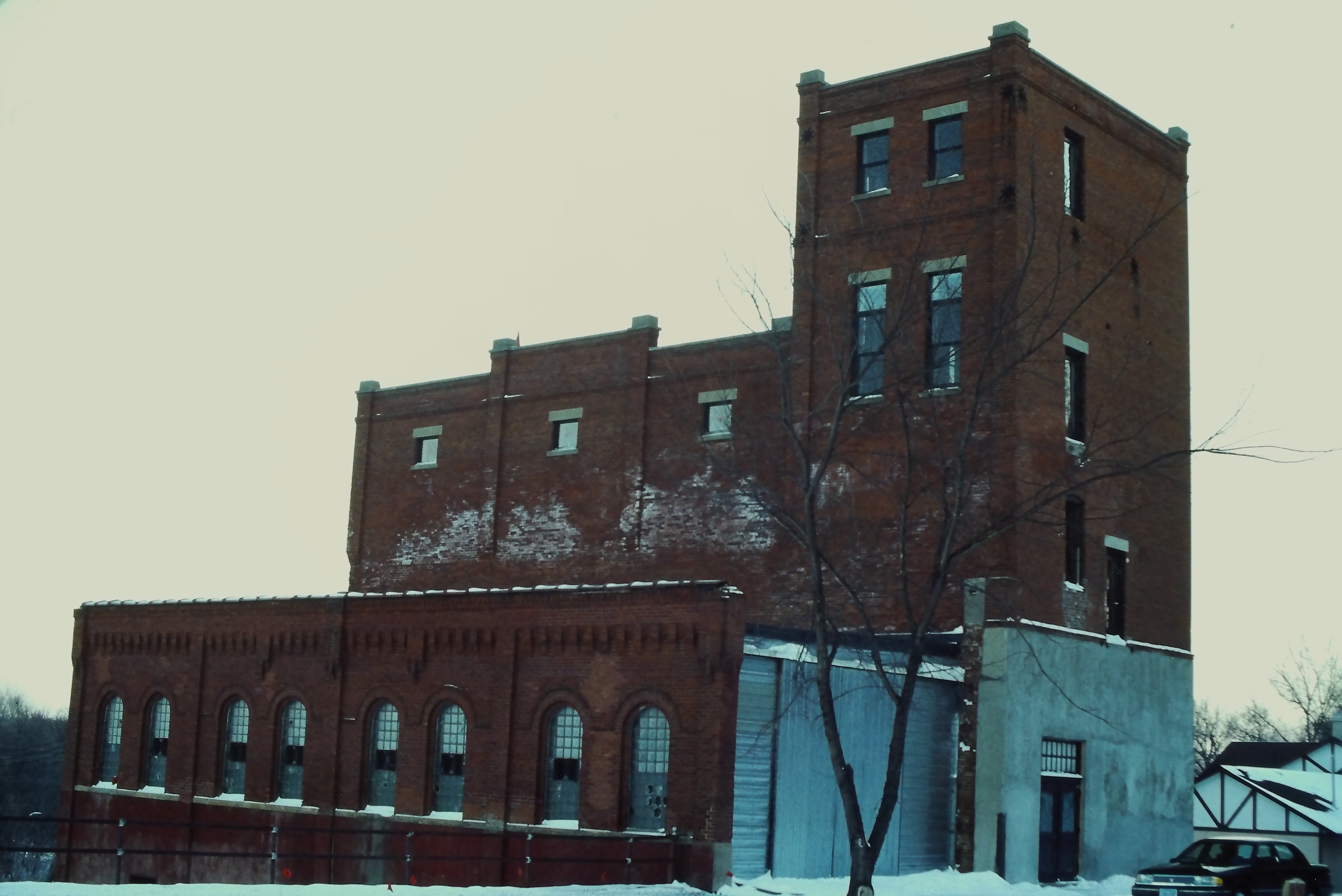
The 1891 façade of the brewery.

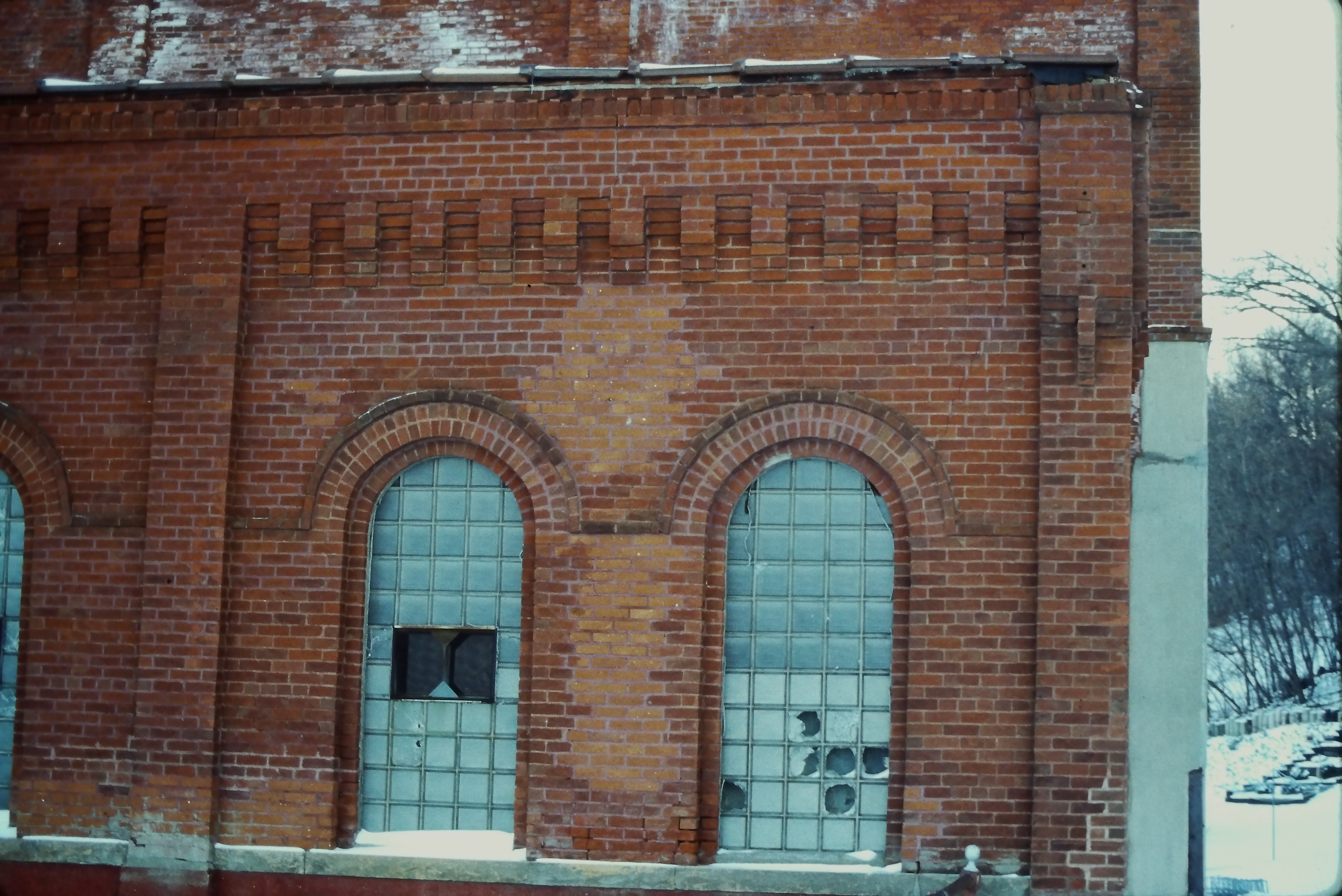
A closer view of the 1891 brewery building in New Ulm, Minnesota.

The 1880's Hauenstein brewery building is one of the only surviving examples of the company's history in New Ulm. The building was saved from demolition by David J. Harmening of New Ulm. Harmening created the John Hauenstein Brewery Preservation Association in March 2016 which sought to keep the building from being destroyed. Since then, Harmening has actively preserved the property.

The red brick budling was recently converted into an Airbnb by two of descendants of the broader Hauenstein family, Mark and Mojra Hauenstein. The two surviving structures of the building include the wash house where beer barrels were washed and the fermentation building where beer barrels were stored during the fermentation process. Beneath the structure is a natural subterranean creek which kept the beer cool while fermenting.
