= Jacob Nix (1822) =

German revolutionary (1822-1897)

Captain Jacob Nix
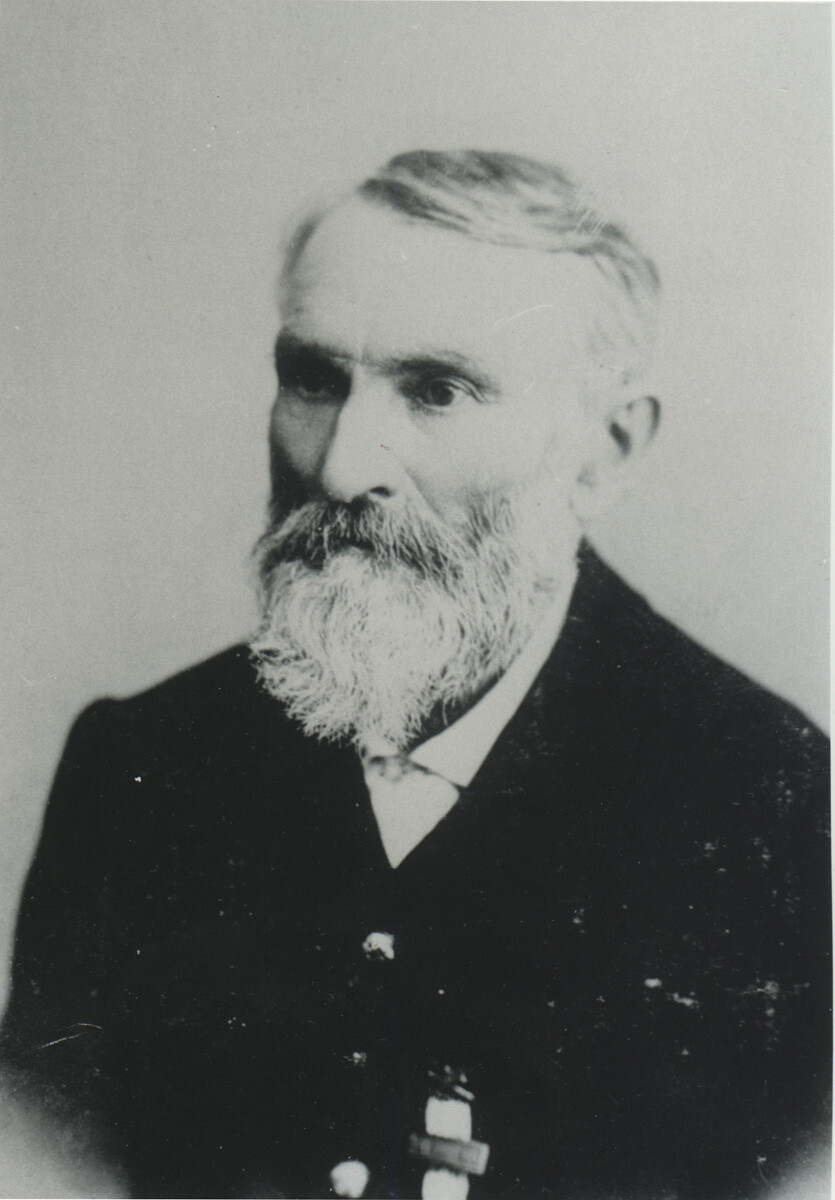
- Nix in the 1880's
- Born: July 17, 1822; Bingen am Rhein
- Died: January 13, 1897 (aged 74); New Ulm, Minnesota, U.S.
- Burial place: New Ulm City Cemetery, New Ulm, Minnesota, U.S.
- Military career
- Allegiance: Palatine Rebel Army; United States of America
- Branch: Freischar; Union Army
- Service years: 1848–1849; 1862–1864
- Rank: Captain
- Units: 1st Minnesota Cavalry Regiment; 2nd Minnesota Cavalry Regiment
- Commands: Company L, 1st Minnesota Cavalry Regiment; Company G, 2nd Minnesota Cavalry Regiment
- Conflicts: Baden Revolution; Palatine Uprising; Battle of Kirchheimbolanden; Dakota War of 1862; Battles of New Ulm; Sioux Wars; Battle of Big Mound; Battle of Dead Buffalo Lake; Battle of Stony Lake; Battle of Killdeer Mountain; Battle of the Badlands

Jacob Nix (July 17, 1822 - January 13, 1897) was a German revolutionary, German Turner, assessor, and municipal clerk of the city of New Ulm, Minnesota. Nix was one of the commanders of the militia forces alongside Charles Eugene Flandrau during the Battles of New Ulm during the Dakota War of 1862 where he was severely wounded.

== Early life ==
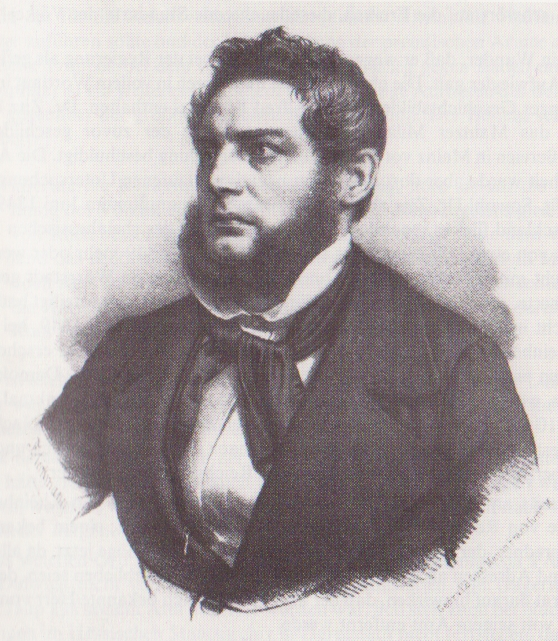
German Revolutionary Franz Heinrich Zitz, Nix was a member of Zit's Freikorps during the Palatine uprising.

Nix was born in Bingen am Rhein on July 17, 1822, the history of his family before 1849 is scarce. Nix was a participant in the Revolutions of 1848, specifically the Palatine uprising, where he fought in the Third Company of Franz Heinrich Zitz's Rhenish Hesse Freischar against the German Confederation. Nix was captured during the failed uprising and was tried with high treason by the German government, however, Nix was able to escape to Antwerp. Like many Germans at the time, Nix fled to the United States due to what he perceived as political persecution from the German government becoming what German-Americans referred to as Forty-eighters. When Nix immigrated to the United States around 1852 he ended up residing in Columbus, Ohio which, at the time, had a large German population. In 1852 Nix married Margaretha (Margaret) Schneider, together they had 4 children; Robert, William, Amalie, and Emmy.

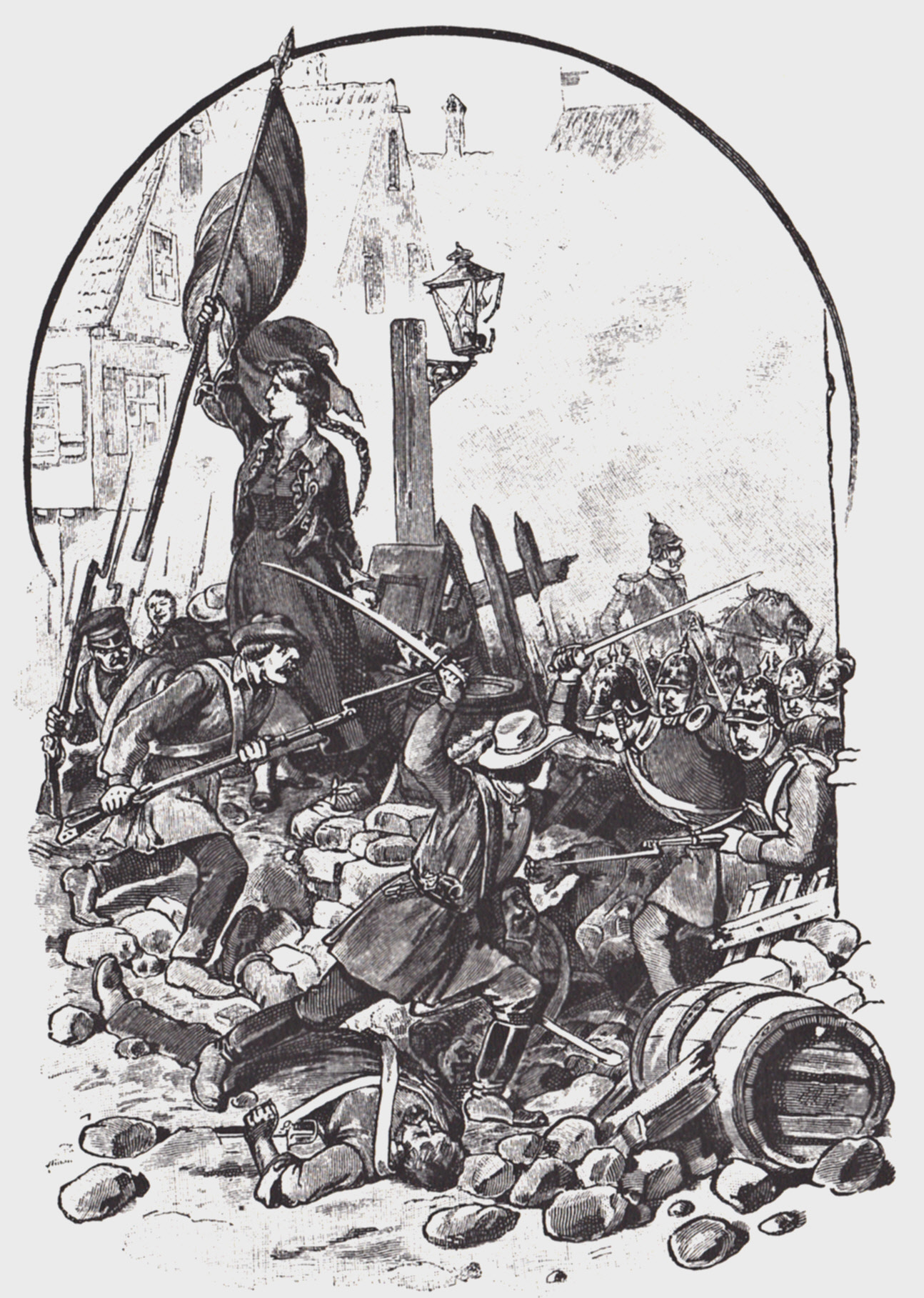
The Battle of Kirchheimbolanden during the Palatine uprising of 1849 which Jacob Nix took part in.

At an 1855 meeting of the National Convention of German-American Turners in Buffalo, New York, Nix heavily supported William Pfaender and his proposal to establish a German Turner colony in Minnesota Territory. Pfaender eventually founded the Chicago Land Association which speculated Dakota land which had been ceded to the United States Government during the Treaty of Traverse des Sioux in the Minnesota River Valley in 1854 where New Ulm was eventually platted. The Chicago Land Association eventually merged with the German Land Association of Minnesota and formally started to sell land in 1857 to prospective Germans moving to Minnesota Territory. The German Land Association was eventually dissolved in 1859 after Minnesota was granted statehood. Nix, Pfaender, and Julius Berndt among others were prominent leaders of the local Turner Hall which housed the town's first school as well as many social and athletic activities.

== Role in the Dakota War ==
When the Dakota War of 1862 occurred Nix was the operator of a local general store in New Ulm. Nix was one of several men who joined Sheriff Charles L. Roos in organizing the Brown County militia for the defense of New Ulm following the Attack at the Lower Sioux Agency. As Colonel Francis Baasen was the only militia officer available in the region Sheriff Charles L. Roos appointed Nix as the Major and commandant of the militia for his experience and service in the Freikorps as a German revolutionary. During the First Battle of New Ulm Nix and Sheriff Roos were the two commanders of the militia. During the battle Nix was severely wounded in the shoulder and had his finger shot off but continued to lead the militia alongside Roos.

Nix's command was eventually replaced with the arrival of Nicollet County Judge Charles Eugene Flandrau who was the local militia commander at Traverse des Sioux. The militia and civilian populace of New Ulm eventually abandoned the city and fled to Mankato, Minnesota where they sought refuge following the two battles which destroyed much of the city.

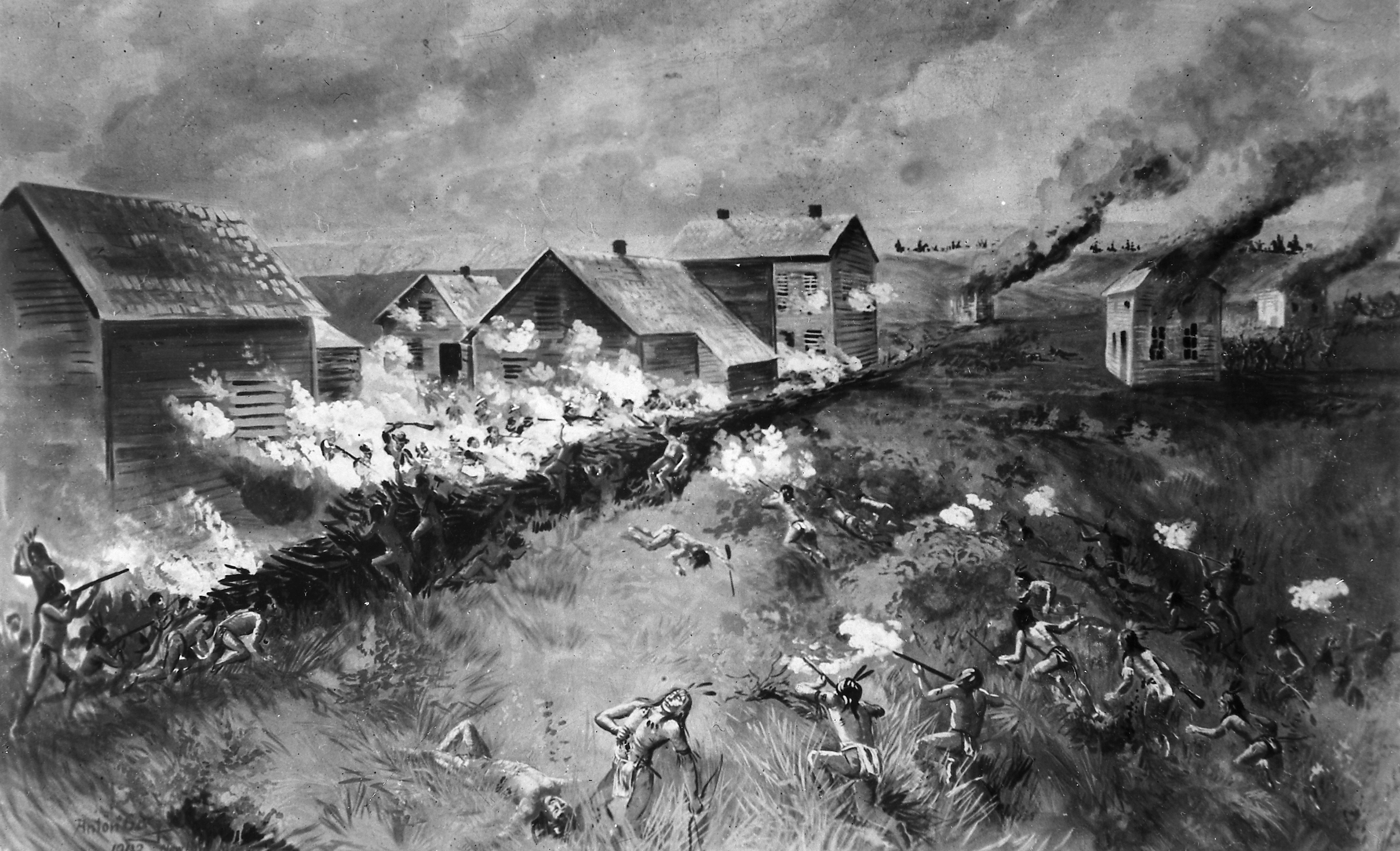
Indian Attack on New Ulm. Nix's militia can be seen behind the barricades on the left.

== Military service against the Dakota ==
When Nix's service in the militia was ended following the defeat of the Dakota at the Battle of Wood Lake he enlisted into the 1st Minnesota Cavalry Regiment and was made Captain of Company L on December 28, 1862. Many other prominent New Ulm citizens joined the 1st Minnesota Cavalry including John Hauenstein, a local brewer who served as Nix's Lieutenant. William Pfaender also served in the 1st Minnesota Cavalry Regiment as the regiments Lieutenant Colonel and would fight with the regiment before being transferred to the 2nd Minnesota Cavalry Regiment.

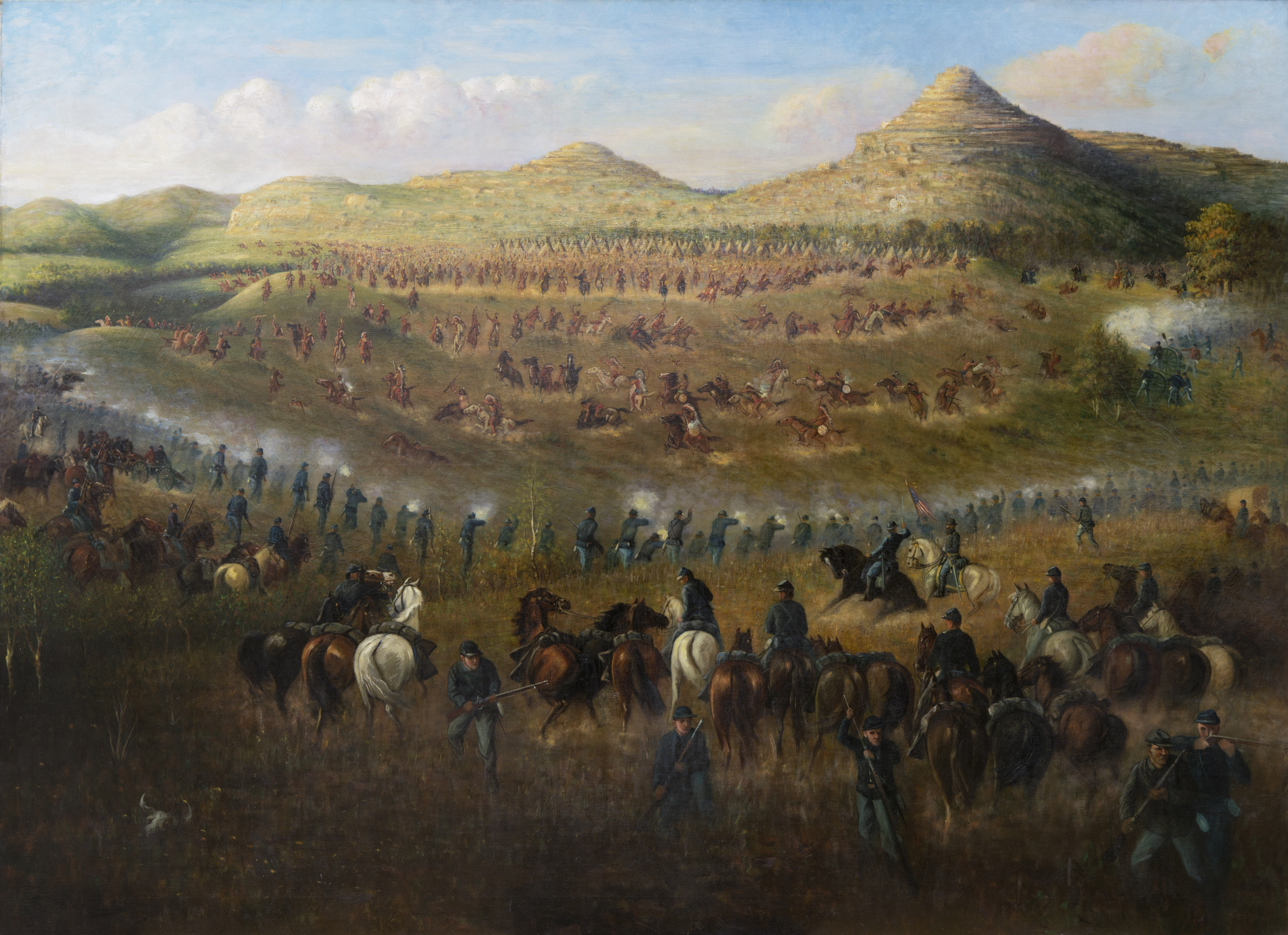
The Battle of Killdeer Mountain. Nix and the rest of the 1st Minnesota Cavalry Regiment participated in the battle.

Captain Nix and the 1st Minnesota Cavalry fought at the Battle of Big Mound, the Battle of Dead Buffalo Lake, and the Battle of Stony Lake. In 1864 Nix was transferred along with many others to Company G of the 2nd Minnesota Cavalry Regiment which saw combat during the Battle of Killdeer Mountain and the Battle of the Badlands. Nix was discharged from the Army on November 4, 1864 with the rank of Captain.

=== Duel in St. Cloud ===
During his military service as the Captain of Company G, 2nd Minnesota Cavalry Nix was involved in a bar fight which turned into a duel in St. Cloud, Minnesota which was started by one of the patrons after Nix called them a "damned Copperhead". The patron and Nix fought with one another until the fight was broken up by Nix's cavalry squadron who joined in the fight. The fight was stopped by Charles Lueg, a fellow German American and the Captain of Company G, 4th Minnesota Infantry Regiment. Lueg persuaded Nix's men and the patrons of the bar to stop fighting as it was not a fair fight. The following day Nix appeared in front of Lueg's business along with 27 men and challenged Lueg to a duel with swords. During the ensuing duel Nix was cut across his forehead and Lueg received a cut on his hand. Nix later threatened to "clean out the town" which caused the local sheriff and citizen to patrol the town at night. Nix's company quietly left St. Cloud with no further threats or altercations.

== Later life ==
Nix later served as the Assessor for the city of New Ulm from 1875 - 1876, and the Town Clerk for five consecutive terms from 1881 - 1886, he was succeeded as Town Clerk by Louis Schilling. Nix also later wrote a 76 page booklet titled "Der Ausbruch der Sioux-Indianer in Minnesota, im August 1862" (The outbreak of the Sioux Indians in Minnesota, in August 1862) which was published in 1887. In the postwar era Nix was an active member in the community. Nix was a member of the Hecker Post No. 48 of the Grand Army of the Republic in New Ulm, the local Turnverein, and reunion groups for the First and Second Minnesota Cavalry. In 1888 Nix was appointed as the head of the Turner Mutual Insurance Association of the Northwest. Nix was later a contributor and promoter of the Hermann Heights Monument built by local architect and sculptor Julius Berndt.

Nix died on January 13, 1897 in New Ulm, he was survived by his wife Margaretha, his son Robert Peter Andrew Nix, and two daughters Amalie Nix and Emmy Steinhauser. Nix is buried in the New Ulm City Cemetery, documents about the Nix family history and Jacob Nix's role in the military are held by both the Brown County Museum and the Minnesota Historical Society.

== Legacy ==
- The "Jacob Nix Platz" in New Ulm is named in honor of Nix and his service to the city of New Ulm as a public servant. A marker for the location stands at the intersection of 2nd North Street and North Broadway on 2nd North Street in New Ulm.
- Nix is listed as one of the defenders of New Ulm on the New Ulm Defenders Monument.
- Nix is featured prominently throughout the exhibit "Never Shall I Forget – A New Look At Brown County and the U.S.-Dakota War" at the Brown County Museum.
