= Robert Neil MacLaren =

Minnesota politician (1828–1886)

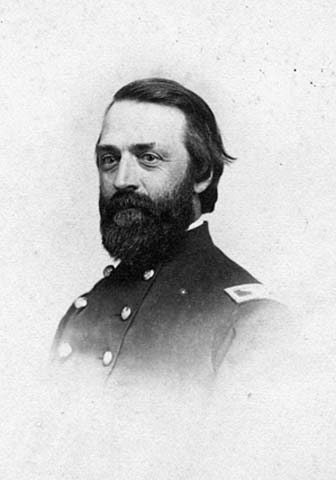
- MacLaren c. 1864 by Joel Emmons Whitney

Member of the Minnesota Senate from the 6th District and 9th District
- In office December 7, 1859 – January 6, 1862
- Governor: Henry Hastings Sibley; Alexander Ramsey

United States Marshal for the District of Minnesota
- In office 1873–1882

Personal details
- Born: Robert Neil MacLaren; April 8, 1828 Caledonia, New York, U.S.
- Died: July 30, 1886 (aged 58) Saint Paul, Minnesota, U.S.
- Resting place: Oakland Cemetery, Saint Paul, Minnesota, U.S.
- Party: Independent 1857-1859; Republican 1859-1861
- Relations: Rear Admiral Donald Campbell MacLaren Jr.
- Education: Union College
- Occupation: Revenue collector, marshall, merchant

Military service
- Allegiance: United States of America
- Branch/service: Union Army
- Years of service: 1862–1866
- Rank: Colonel; Brevet Brigadier General
- Unit: 6th Minnesota Infantry Regiment; 2nd Minnesota Cavalry Regiment
- Commands: 2nd Minnesota Cavalry Regiment
- Battles/wars: Dakota War of 1862; Battle of Birch Coulee; Battle of Wood Lake; Sibley's 1863 Campaign; Battle of Big Mound; Battle of Dead Buffalo Lake; Battle of Stony Lake

Robert Neil MacLaren (McLaren) (April 9, 1828 – July 30, 1886) was a Minnesota politician, businessman, United States Marshal, tax collector, and Brigadier General during the American Civil War, the Dakota War of 1862, and Sibley's 1863 Campaign.

== Early life ==
Robert Neil MacLaren (also spelled McLaren) was born in Caledonia, New York, on April 8, 1828. MacLaren was the son of Reverend Donald Campell McLaren of the United Presbyterian Church and Jane (Nee: Stephenson/ Stevenson) McLaren, both of which were of Scottish ancestry. MacLaren studied at Union College but later quit in 1851 due to poor health. MacLaren's first business enterprise was partnering with Henry W. Corbett in Portland, Oregon. During his time in Portland MacLaren served as a member of the Portland City Council for a term of one year from 1853 - 1854. In 1857 MacLaren moved to Minnesota Territory, choosing to reside in Red Wing, Minnesota. MacLaren worked as a businessman in trading lumber for Densmore and McLaren, the Densemore's being a prominent abolitionist family in both Goodhue County and Wisconsin.

== Politics ==
In 1859 MacLaren was elected to the Minnesota Senate from Goodhue County and served throughout the second and third sessions of the Minnesota Legislature. MacLaren was part of District 6 of the 2nd Minnesota Legislature (1859-1860) and later part of District 9 of the 3rd Minnesota Legislature (1861). Although MacLaren was initially an Independent politician from 1857-1859 he was later a staunch supporter of the Republican Party.

== Military career ==
At the beginning of the Dakota War of 1862 MacLaren organized a company of volunteers for the 6th Minnesota Infantry Regiment and was appointed to the rank of Major of the regiment. MacLaren led a detachment of reinforcements of the 6th Minnesota alongside Colonel Samuel McPhail's cavalry to relieve the besieged Minnesota volunteer troops at the Battle of Birch Coulee. MacLaren later took part in the decisive engagement at the Battle of Wood Lake which brought an end to Little Crow's uprising.

MacLaren was later promoted to the rank of Colonel for his service in the Dakota War and was given command of the 2nd Minnesota Cavalry Regiment. MacLaren would accompany Henry Hastings Sibley during Sibley's 1863 Campaign. The 2nd Minnesota Cavalry would later fight at the Battle of Killdeer Mountain and the Battle of the Badlands under the overall command of Alfred Sully, which MacLaren would fight two consecutive campaigns with. MacLaren was mustered out of the service on November 17, 1865, with the rank of brevet Brigadier General.

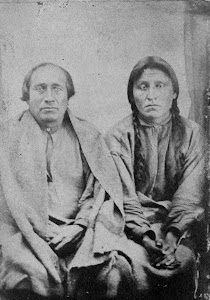
Little Six and Medicine Bottle at Fort Snelling. Minnesota Historical Society.

=== Execution of Shakopee and Medicine Bottle ===
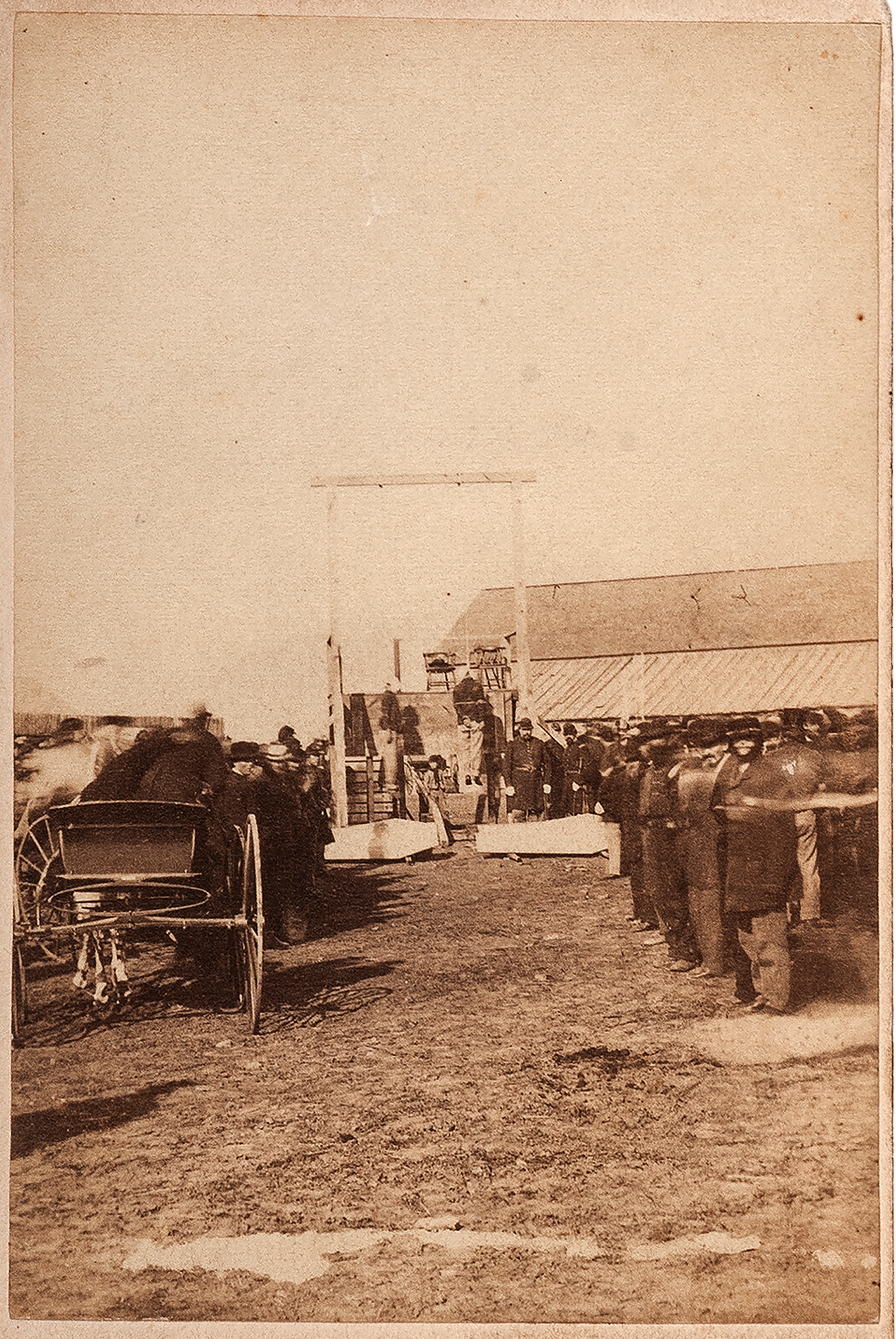
Hanging of Little Six and Medicine Bottle c. 1865. MacLaren can be seen to the right of the gallows.

During the ensuing Sioux Wars against the Dakota people many different leaders were accused of taking part in the broader Dakota War of 1862, one of these people was Chief Shakopee III (Little Six) of the Mdewakanton tribe of the Dakota. Shakopee and Wakan Ozanzan or "Medicine Bottle" (a medicine man), were both captured in January 1864 at Fort Garry by fur traders who were employed as guides for Hatch's Minnesota Cavalry Battalion. In the spring of 1864 Shakopee and Medicine Bottle were brought back to Fort Snelling, at the time McLaren was serving as the fort's Commandant. On November 11, 1865 McLaren oversaw the execution of the two Dakota men, Little Six even gave MacLaren his ceremonial pipe along with several letters to his wife.

=== Peace Commissioner for the Bureau of Indian Affairs ===
In 1866 at the end of his military career MacLaren was sent by the Commissioner of Indian Affairs along with many other signatories to sign several treaties with the Cheyenne, Sicangu, and Oglala.

== Personal life ==
MacLaren married Anna McVean in 1857 from Livingston County, New York. Similar to McLaren, McVean was also of Scottish American ancestry. Together, the McLarens had three children; Jennie MacLaren, Robert Finley MacLaren, and Archibald MacLaren. Archibald was later a renowned doctor in Saint Paul, Minnesota and was the Professor of Surgery at the University of Minnesota. MacLaren was the brother of United States Navy Rear Admiral and Chaplain Donald Campbell MacLaren Jr. (1834-1920).

== Later life ==
Following his military career MacLaren became an assessor for the Internal Revenue Service, as well as the United States Marshal for the District of Minnesota on May 17, 1873 by Ulysses S. Grant, and again by Rutherford B. Hayes in November 1877. MacLaren died on July 30, 1886 in Saint Paul, Minnesota and is buried in Oakland Cemetery in St. Paul along with the rest of his family.

== See also ==
- Dakota War of 1862
- 2nd Minnesota Cavalry Regiment
- United States District Court for the District of Minnesota
- Shakopee III
- Medicine Bottle (Mdewakanton)
- Fort Snelling
