= Fort Dilts =

Historic fort in North Dakota, United States

- U.S. National Register of Historic Places
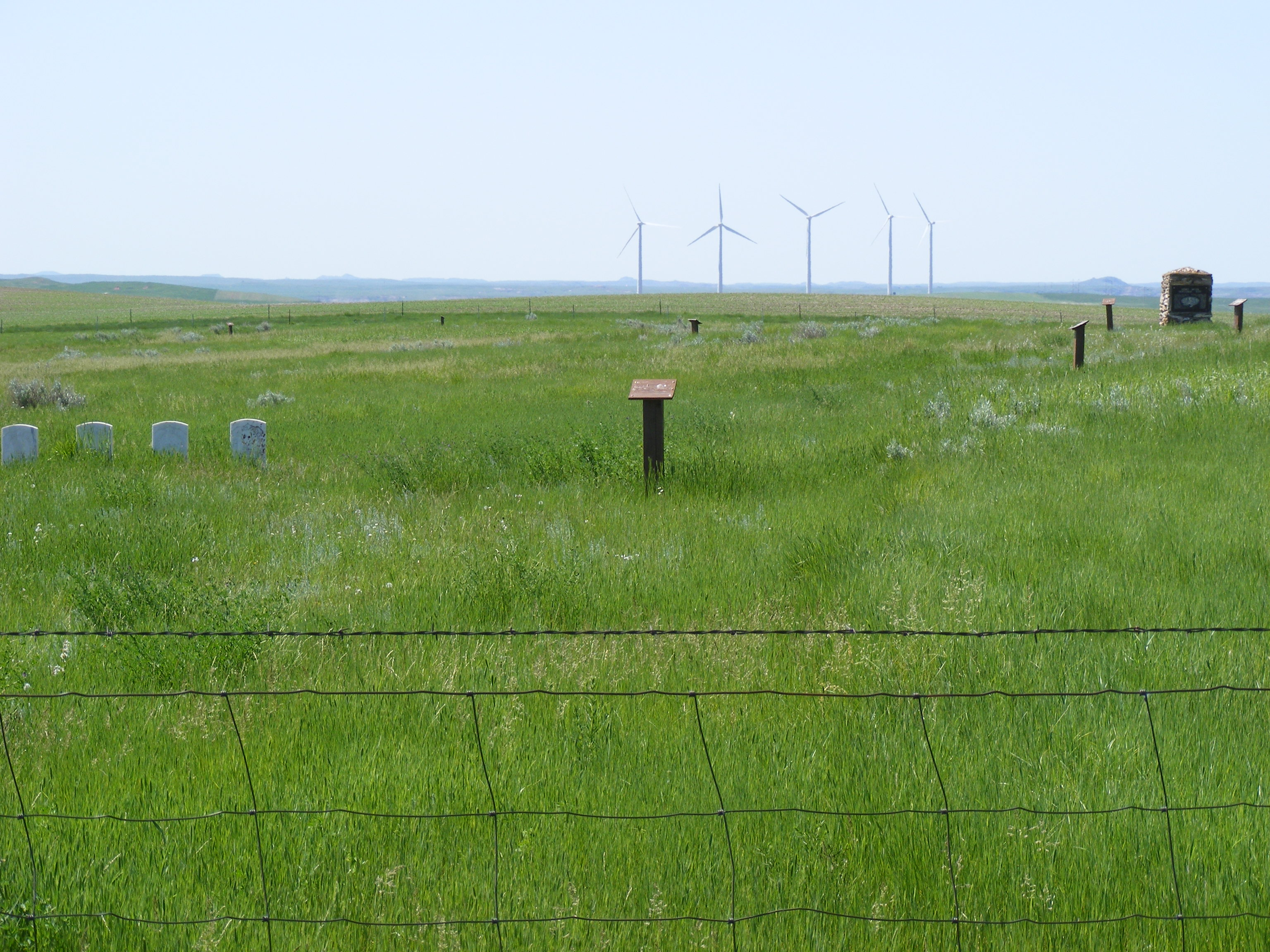

- Location within North Dakota Location within the United States
- Nearest city: Rhame, North Dakota
- Coordinates: 46°16′43″N 103°46′33″W
- Area: 8.3 acres (3.4 ha)
- Built: 1864
- NRHP reference No.: 80002907
- Added to NRHP: November 10, 1980

Fort Dilts was a makeshift sod fort built near Rhame, North Dakota, United States, in September 1864 to fend off attacks by Hunkpapa Sioux Indians led by Sitting Bull upon an encircled wagon train of would-be gold-miners and a small military escort of convalescent soldiers.

The wagon train had set out from Fort Ridgely, Minnesota, under the command of Captain James L. Fisk of the U.S. Quartermaster Corps. In 1864, amidst the American Civil War, the Dakota Territory was relatively short of military protection. On September 2, the party came under attack by Sitting Bull and a group of Hunkpapa Sioux. Two days later, still harassed by the Sioux, the expedition found a suitable spot and constructed a defensive perimeter out of sod stacked 6.5 feet (2.0 m) high and 300 feet (91 m) in diameter. The defenders named it Fort Dilts in honor of Corporal Jefferson Dilts, one of eight U.S. Army soldiers who had been killed, out of 50. A number of civilians also died. Lieutenant Smith and fifteen others managed to reach Fort Rice. Colonel Daniel J Dill organized a rescue expedition on 11th of September with a column of 850 men, 550 infantry, 300 cavalry, and one section of artillery (300 from the 30th Wisconsin, 200 from the 8th Minnesota, 100 from the 7th Iowa Cavalry (dismounted) and 100 each from the 2nd Minnesota Cavalry, Bracketts Battalion and the 6th Iowa Cavalry. The Minnesota units rendezvoused at Fort Ripley to head west. The defenders were rescued on September 20. When the wagon moved out, a wagon with poisoned food was left behind by Minnesotans that had lost family in the Sioux Uprising. Upon reaching Fort Rice the wagon expedition disbanded.

Fort Dilts State Historic Site has been a North Dakota historic site since 1932. As "Fort Dilts", it was listed on the National Register of Historic Places in 1980. The listing was for 8.3 acres (3.4 ha) with one contributing site and one contributing structure. Remaining at the site are a sod enclosure, wagon ruts, several grave markers, and an interpretive sign.
