= James L. Fisk =

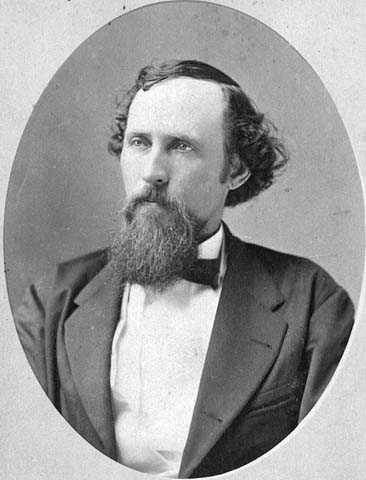
- Fisk c. 1865
- Born: September 12, 1835; Royalton Center, New York, U.S.
- Died: November 2, 1902 (aged 67); Saint Paul, Minnesota, U.S.
- Burial place: Oakland Cemetery, Saint Paul, Minnesota, U.S.
- Military career
- Allegiance: United States of America
- Branch: Union Army
- Service years: 1861–1866
- Rank: Captain
- Units: Company B, 3rd Minnesota Infantry Regiment; United States Army Quartermaster Corps

James Liberty Fisk (ca. 1835 – 1902) was an officer in the Union Army during the American Civil War who promoted settlement of the western United States. He led four expeditions from Minnesota to Montana in the 1860s, before resigning his commission and settling there himself.

== Early life ==
Fisk was born in New York of Irish extraction, the eldest of six sons of John B. and Jerusha T. Fisk. He worked as a "raftsman, farmer, carriage maker, and newspaperman" for the Daily Courier of Lafayette, Indiana. Four of his five brothers also became newspapermen.

Becoming engrossed with the western frontier, he moved to White Bear Lake, Minnesota, sometime in the 1850s, married Lydia Burson, and started farming. In 1857, he was in the expedition of William H. Nobles which tried unsuccessfully to build a wagon road from Fort Ridgely to South Pass. Later, he was the secretary of the Dakota Land Company, which promoted settlement along the road.

== Civil War service ==
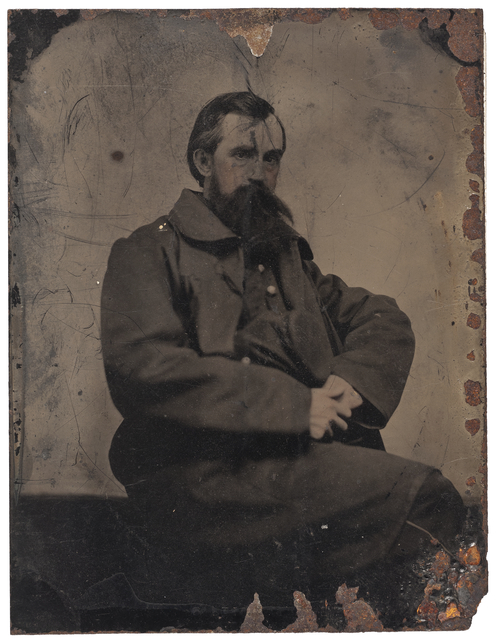
Fisk while serving in Company B in the 3rd Minnesota Infantry Regiment

In 1861, he enlisted in the Third Minnesota Volunteer Infantry as a private. An undisciplined soldier, on May 19, 1862, he was called to Washington, DC, where he was "commissioned captain and assistant quartermaster of volunteers in the quartermaster corps" and "appointed superintendent of emigration ... on a route between Fort Abercrombie, Dakota, and Fort Walla Walla, Washington", a political appointment engineered by influential Minnesotans interested in promoting the settlement of the west. Secretary of War Edwin Stanton instructed him to "organize and outfit a corps for the protection of emigrants 'against all dangers' that might beset their way west." He was authorized to enlist 50 men for this purpose.

He had little supervision in his new responsibilities:

Fisk was commissioned in the quartermaster corps, yet the quartermaster kept no financial records of his activities; he was on detached duty under assignment from the secretary of war, yet he was a volunteer and owed his appointment to influence from Minnesota; he was ordered to report regularly to the adjutant general, yet he had no immediate superior who was at all concerned with what he was doing. His Western duties were of no great importance to the war department in its preoccupation with the larger concerns of the Civil War.

=== 1862 expedition ===
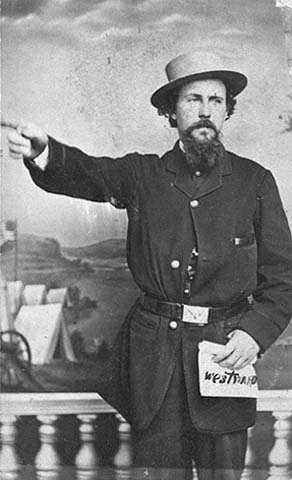
Fisk during his 1862 expedition holding a paper that says "westward", hinting at the notion of manifest destiny

Fisk's budget was relatively small; $5000 was deposited to his account and, at the end of his journey, he was expected to auction off his wagons, animals and other equipment to recoup as much as possible. A careless man where money was concerned, Fisk did not clear all of his incurred debts until years afterward.

Fisk reached Saint Paul, Minnesota, on June 4 and placed an advertisement for emigrants in the Pioneer and Democrat. He secured the services of experienced guide Pierre Bottineau, who had guided the earlier Stevens Expedition of 1853. According to Nathaniel P. Langford, "E. H. Burritt was first assistant, the writer [Langford] second assistant and commissary, and Samuel R. Bond was secretary. Among the guards were "David E. Folsom, Patrick Doherty (Baptiste), Robert C. Knox, Patrick Bray, Cornelius Bray, Ard Godfrey, and many well-known pioneers of Montana."

The party set out from St. Paul on June 16 and followed the same route Stevens had taken. They celebrated the Fourth of July at Fort Abercrombie, where Fisk found more emigrants waiting for him. A total of "117 men, 13 women, 53 wagons, 168 oxen, 17 cows, 13 saddle horses, 14 team horses, and 8 mules" were in Fisk's care when they departed on July 7. They reached what is now Wells County, North Dakota, on July 19, Fort Union on August 9, and their destination near Fort Benton in what is now Montana on September 5. Here, Fisk's duty ended, but as he had been instructed to sell his equipment at Walla Walla, he accompanied the emigrants further unofficially. Eighty-two people split off to prospect for gold at Prickly Pear Creek, while a smaller group continued on to the gold fields of the Salmon River, leaving only three wagons and 14 men to accompany Fisk to Walla Walla.

Fisk returned to Washington and turned in his official report to the Adjutant General's office on February 17, 1863. After the Secretary of War presented it to Congress, five thousand copies were ordered printed. Minnesota Senators Morton S. Wilkinson and Henry Mower Rice and Representatives Cyrus Aldrich and William Windom applauded his success, and Fisk was authorized to lead a second expedition, with a somewhat larger budget.

=== 1863 expedition ===
Because of Indian unrest, Fisk's second expedition mustered only 60 or 62 people, and many of them were on his payroll. The group departed from Fort Ripley on June 25. Fisk took a route to the north of his previous path due to widespread drought. The party reached the vicinity of Fort Benton on September 7.

An old prospector gave Fisk some gold nuggets to take back to President Abraham Lincoln as a present. Fisk put them in an old valise, which fell out unnoticed near Salt Lake City on the stagecoach ride back, necessitating a search back 90 miles (140 km) to find it.

Upon his return to Washington on February 23, 1864, he was promptly arrested for not having a pass. He also got into trouble for not reporting to military headquarters. On February 29, he presented the gold nuggets to Lincoln in the White House. Fisk was further dogged by two separate complaints, one regarding an unpaid draft used to purchase oxen during the second expedition, and the other by the Overland Stage Line over alleged misconduct of Fisk and his men on the trip to Washington.

Despite these troubles, Fisk was once again appointed superintendent of the northern route, though later than the superintendents of other routes. The Secretary of War instructed him to follow a path specified by Congress, despite an attempt by Senator Wilkinson to change it to a shorter route.

=== 1864 expedition: Attacked by Sitting Bull ===
Because of his late appointment and start, Fisk returned to Minnesota to find that many of the emigrants had tired of waiting for him and had departed in a separate group. Nonetheless, he set out from Fort Ridgely with the remaining 97 wagons. He ignored the route he had been ordered to take. At Fort Rice on the Missouri River, Fisk asked for and obtained an army escort—47 men of Company A, Dakota Cavalry, commanded by Lieutenant Smith—as relations with the Native Americans had turned hostile. The enlarged party, including 200 emigrants and 88 wagons, set out from the fort on August 23.

On September 2, one wagon overturned. Nine soldiers and two other wagons remained at the scene while repairs were made; the rest of the wagon train proceeded on. The small isolated group was found and attacked by Sitting Bull and about 100 Hunkpapa Sioux. In the fighting, Sitting Bull was shot in the hip. Hearing the gunfire, Fisk and about 50 men hurried back from the main body. Scout Jefferson Dilts charged forward recklessly and shot as many as six Sioux before being killed by arrows. Fisk and the others held off the Native Americans until sunset, then snuck back to the main group. Ten soldiers, Dilts, and another civilian had been killed, while the Sioux had lost six. The next day, the Sioux attacked again, forcing the expedition to corral their wagons. They constructed sod walls for "Fort Dilts" and defended themselves against 400 attackers without further casualties. They had access to a source of water, and there were ample supplies in their wagons.

After several unsuccessful attacks, the Sioux opened negotiations under a flag of truce via notes written by Fanny Kelly, a woman they had taken captive in July. They offered her and safe passage in exchange for supplies. Fisk bid "three horses, flour, sugar, and coffee for her, but the Lakotas wanted forty head of cattle and four wagons", and the trade was off. (A few months later, Fanny Kelly was either released by Sitting Bull or, by her account, escaped; she later wrote a popular book of her experiences, Narrative of My Captivity Among the Sioux Indians, in 1871.)

On the night of September 5, Lieutenant Smith and 13 men rode to Fort Rice for reinforcements. An annoyed Brigadier General Alfred Sully dispatched 900 men on September 18. On September 20, the Fisk party was escorted back to the safety of Fort Rice, whereupon the expedition disbanded.

While Fisk was viewed favorably by civilians, to the military authorities, he had committed "gross military offenses" and was "too reckless and too ignorant to be trusted." Fisk submitted his report to the Adjutant General on January 13, 1865, and returned to Washington in February with his wife and their child.

On May 22, with the war coming to an end and a new administration in office following the assassination of Abraham Lincoln, Fisk tendered his resignation from the army. He was discharged on June 12. When the Fisk family departed the city, they left behind an unpaid $850 hotel bill.

== 1866 expedition ==
Fisk was unable to organize a party in 1865, but the following year, he set out for Helena, Montana, with his last and largest expedition. His brothers, Robert Emmett (1837–1908), Van Hayden (1840–1890), and Andrew Jackson Fisk (January 8, 1849 – 1910), accompanied him, with Robert serving as his second in command and Van as wagon master. Also in the party was photographer William H. Illingworth, who shot 30 stereographs along the way, at least some of which still survive. According to an advertising pamphlet, Fisk wanted to depart on or about May 22 and hopefully no later than May 29 from St. Cloud, Minnesota, to the "Great Gold Fields of Montana", with "Military Protection Guaranteed by the Government". Passage for one man with 50 pounds (23 kg) of baggage, and subsistence was set at $100. The expedition consisted of 500 people and 160 wagons. It left Fort Abercrombie on the morning of June 16, reached Fort Berthold on July 19, and made its way to Fort Union on August 2. It arrived in Helena in September.

== Later life ==
The Fisk brothers and their families settled in the Montana region and played a part in its development. Andrew and Robert published the Helena Herald newspaper, starting in 1866, with James as a co-editor from January to July 1867, and Van also employed by the paper. James was also involved with the Montana militia and various other ventures. Andrew served as Adjutant General of the Montana Territory under Governor B. Platt Carpenter; Robert edited the Herald for 36 years and was an active Republican supporter; and Van owned and published the Townsend Tranchant newspaper, and engaged in mining and farming.

In 1902, James Liberty Fisk died in the Minnesota Soldiers Home in Minneapolis.
