= Brown County Museum (New Ulm, Minnesota) =

Museum in New Ulm, Minnesota

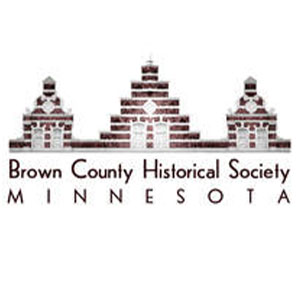

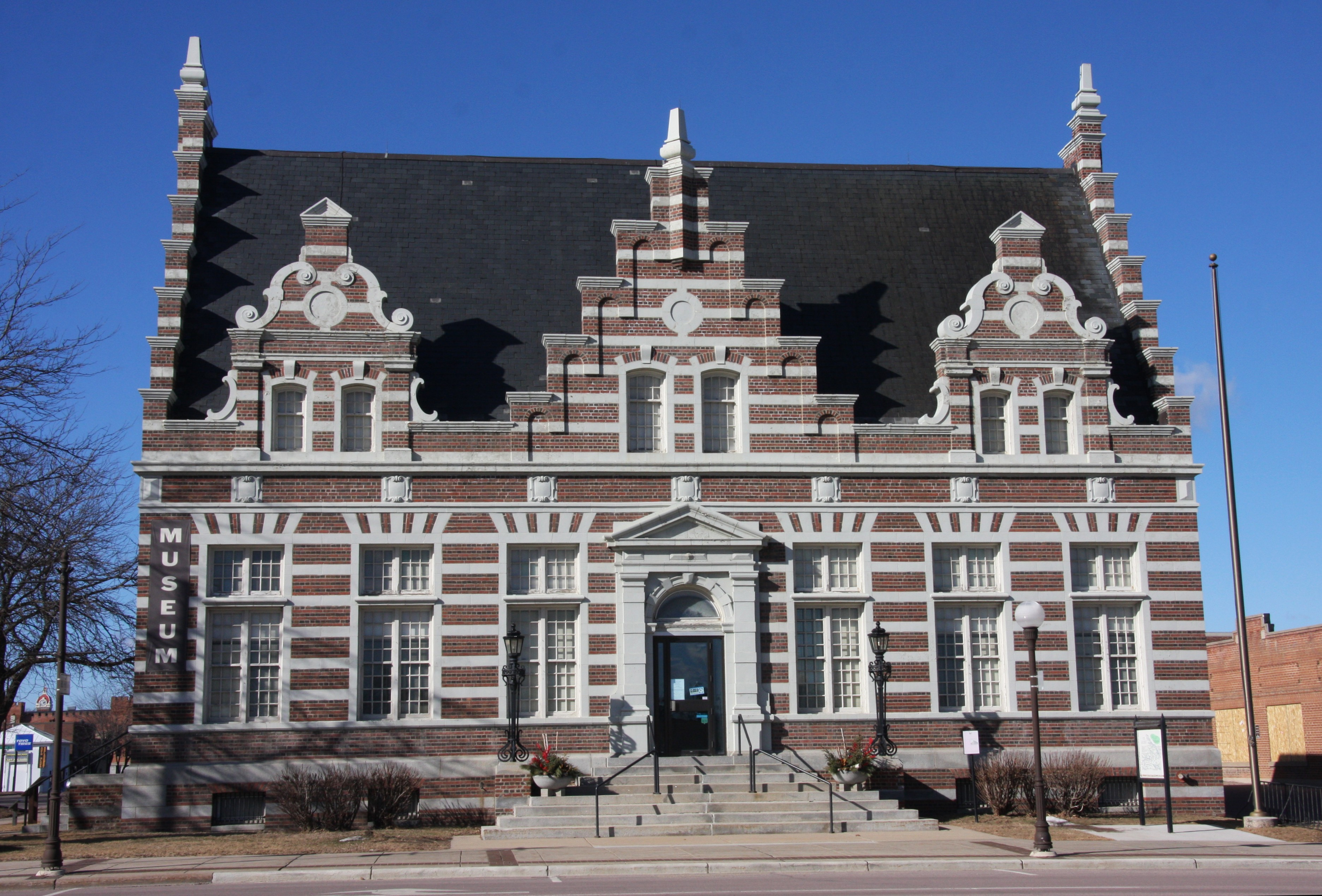
- Exterior of the museum
- Established: 1937
- Location: 2 North Broadway Street, New Ulm, Minnesota 56073 United States
- Type: Local history
- Website: browncountyhistorymn.org
- New Ulm Post Office
- U.S. National Register of Historic Places
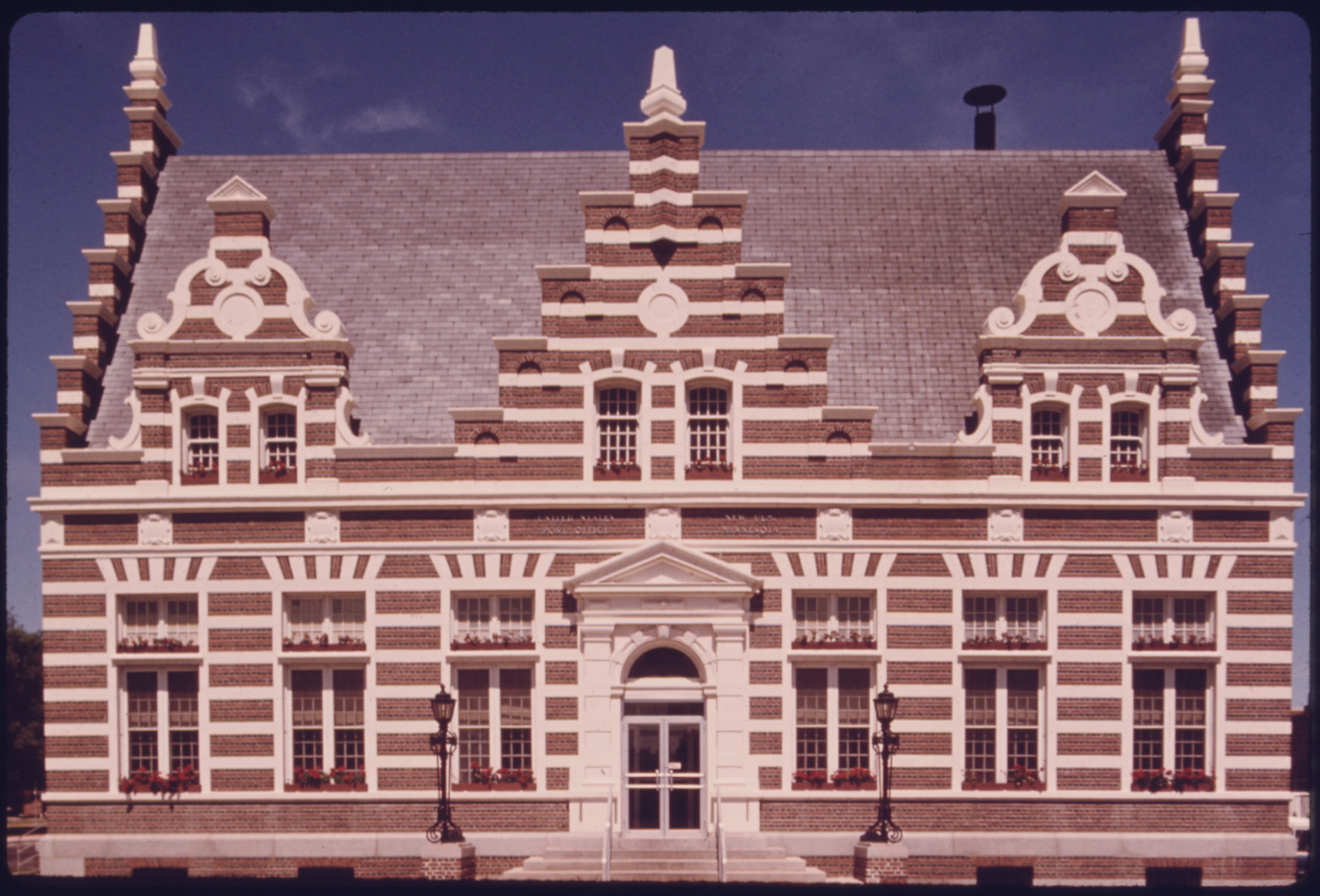

- Location within Minnesota Location within the United States
- Interactive map showing the location of the New Ulm Post Office
- Location: 2 North Broadway Street, New Ulm, Minnesota 56073 United States
- Coordinates: 44°18′46.76″N 94°27′36.89″W
- Area: less than one acre
- Built: 1909-1910
- Architect: James Knox Taylor
- NRHP reference No.: 70000287
- Added to NRHP: April 28, 1970

The Brown County Museum has been located in the former New Ulm Post Office building since 1985. The historic building in New Ulm, Minnesota, United States was built in 1909 and was placed on the National Register of Historic Places (NRHP) on April 28, 1970. The building is significant as it reflects local German culture of the founders of New Ulm in1854 and population at the time it was built. The building of German Renaissance design is considered excellently preserved.

== Museum ==
The museum features three floors of exhibits that explore the history of Brown County and its people. The first floor features a permanent exhibit titled "Becoming Brown County: The Land and its People". This exhibit highlights the history of the Dakota people who lived in the area for centuries before European settlers arrived, as well as the German immigrants who founded New Ulm in 1857.

The second floor features rotating exhibits on a variety of topics related to Brown County history. There's also a new child-friendly Explorer's Corner with hands-on activities to keep young visitors engaged. The third floor is home to the long-term exhibit "Never Shall I Forget", which tells the story of the U.S.-Dakota War of 1862. The conflict was a major turning point in Minnesota history, and the exhibit tells the stories of the people who were caught up in the violence.

=== Brown County Historical Society ===
The establishment of the Brown County Historical Society dates back to May 29, 1930. The society's founding members initiated the collection of artifacts to furnish a dedicated museum building. In 1935, New Ulm began the construction of a new library building, with the library occupying the first floor and a history museum located in the basement. The museum operated in that space from 1937 to 1984, the museum moved across the street to its present-day location.

== New Ulm Post Office building ==
=== History ===
Funding for the construction of the New Ulm Post Office was approved by Congress in 1906, with the site being purchased that same year. Initially allocated $39,000, there was significant pushback in New Ulm upon receiving the preliminary plans, as they were deemed to lack architectural beauty. Following a subsequent omnibus bill that added $20,000, totaling $50,000, new plans were developed. Overseen by supervising architect James Knox Taylor of Washington and constructed by contractors Stewart and Hager of Janesville, Wisconsin, the building was designed with the German heritage of New Ulm in mind and was eventually completed and opened in 1910.

The building served as the Post Office from 1910 until 1976. Subsequently, it was acquired by Brown County, and with collaborative efforts from the county and the City of New Ulm, the structure was renovated to become a museum for the Brown County Historical Society. The historical society officially relocated to the building in 1984.

== Structure ==
The original exterior design and construction of the building are singularly unique. The structure is of alternating course of deep red tough brick and grey-white terra cotta stone, a manufactured concrete stone. Below the first floor, the exterior walls are of brick and granite to the ground level. Overall measurements of the structure are: 72' 5" long, 55' wide, total height 59'.

The building features a grand main entrance facing south on Center Street with a Doric pediment, cornice, and squared columns. Additionally, there is a western entrance on Broadway. The structure stands at one and a half stories high, with a steep slate roof adorned with end gables, stepped-up windows, and decorative gables showcasing Renaissance design elements influenced by German Renaissance and Baroque styles.

The unique character of this building results primarily from the unusually steep roof, flanked by the stepped gable and dormer ends. It lacks grace and refinement yet is brutally dramatic.

== See also ==
- List of museums in Minnesota
