= Lake Hendricks =

Lake in the states of Minnesota & South Dakota, United States

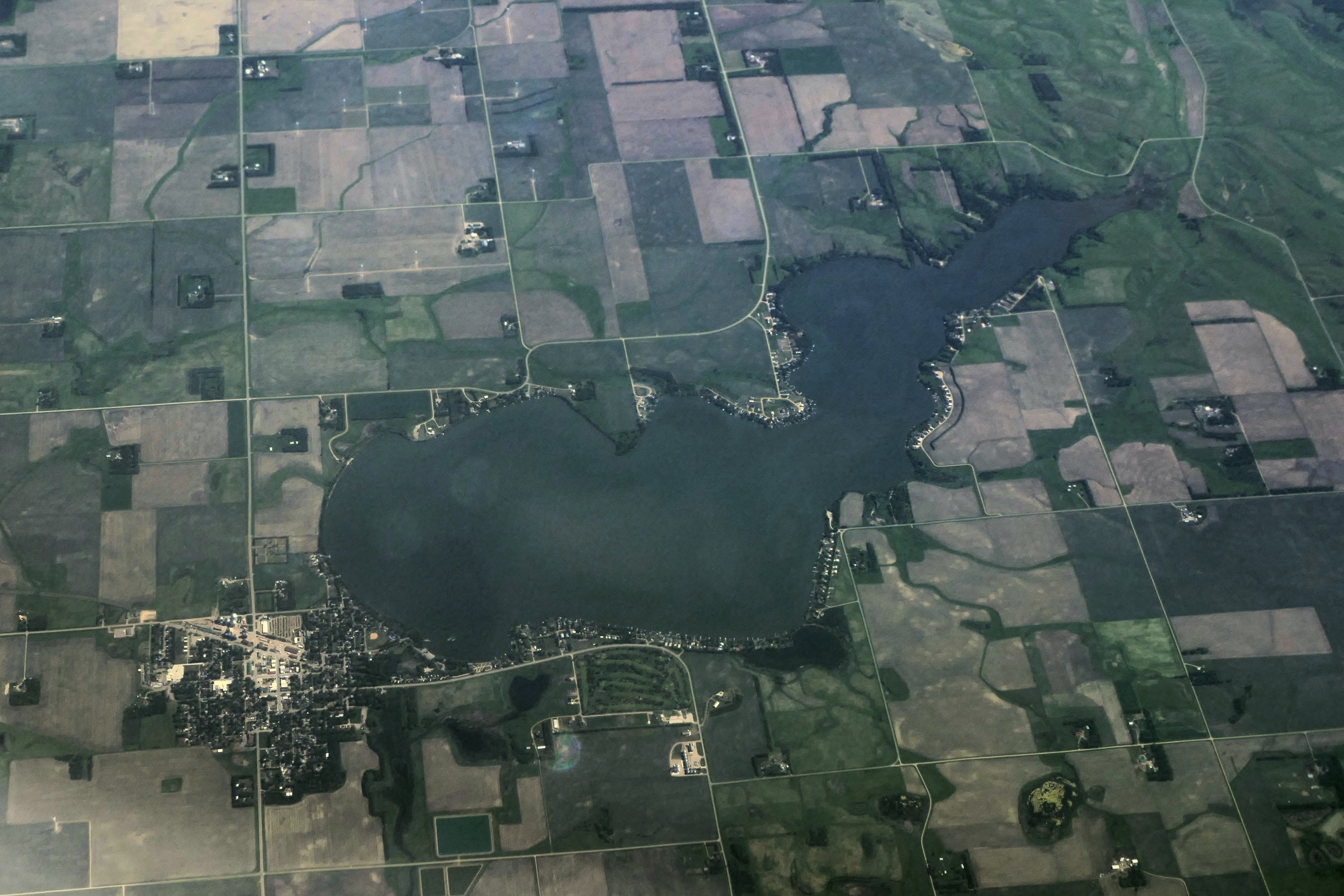

- Location within Minnesota Location within South Dakota
- Location: Minnesota and South Dakota
- Coordinates: 44°29′37″N 96°27′22″W
- Type: lake
- Basin countries: United States
- Surface area: 1,557 acres (630 ha)
- Surface elevation: 1,755 ft (535 m)

Lake Hendricks is a lake in the U.S. states of Minnesota and South Dakota.

Lake Hendricks was named in about 1857 for Indiana governor and Vice President of the United States, Thomas A. Hendricks.
