= Battles of New Ulm =

Battle of the Dakota War of 1862

- Part of The Dakota War of 1862
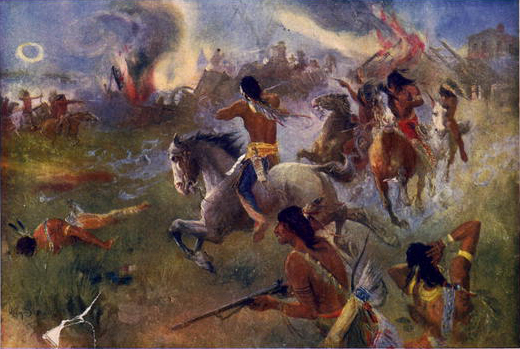
- The Siege of New Ulm, Minnesota by Henry August Schwabe
Date	August 19, 1862 and August 23, 1862
Location	New Ulm, Brown County, Minnesota 44°18′48″N 94°27′41″W
Result	Santee Sioux defeat (attacks repulsed; city temporarily evacuated following day)

Belligerents
United States	Santee Sioux

Commanders and leaders
First Battle; Jacob Nix; Charles Roos; Second Battle; Charles Flandrau; William Dodd	Second Battle; Little Crow; Mankato; Big Eagle

Strength
First Battle; 20–55; Second Battle; 325 (250 engaged); 2,000 unarmed civilians	First Battle; 100; Second Battle; 350-650

Casualties and losses
First Battle; 6 killed (including one civilian); 5 wounded; Second Battle; 29 Killed (including three civilians); 55 Wounded	~100 killed or wounded in both battles

The Battles of New Ulm, also known as the New Ulm Massacre, were two battles in August 1862 between Dakota men and European settlers and militia in New Ulm, Minnesota early in the Dakota War of 1862. Dakota forces attacked New Ulm on August 19 and again on August 23, destroying much of the town but failing to fully capture it. After the second attack, New Ulm was evacuated.

== Location ==
In 1862, New Ulm, Minnesota, had 900 residents and was the largest settlement near the Lower Sioux reservation. After the Battle of Fort Ridgely, the town was seen as a tempting target for a Dakota attack. The topography of New Ulm presented an advantage for the Dakota, since the land rises some 200 feet out of the Minnesota River valley in two large steps (terraces), with wooded area to provide cover for an attack.

== Background ==
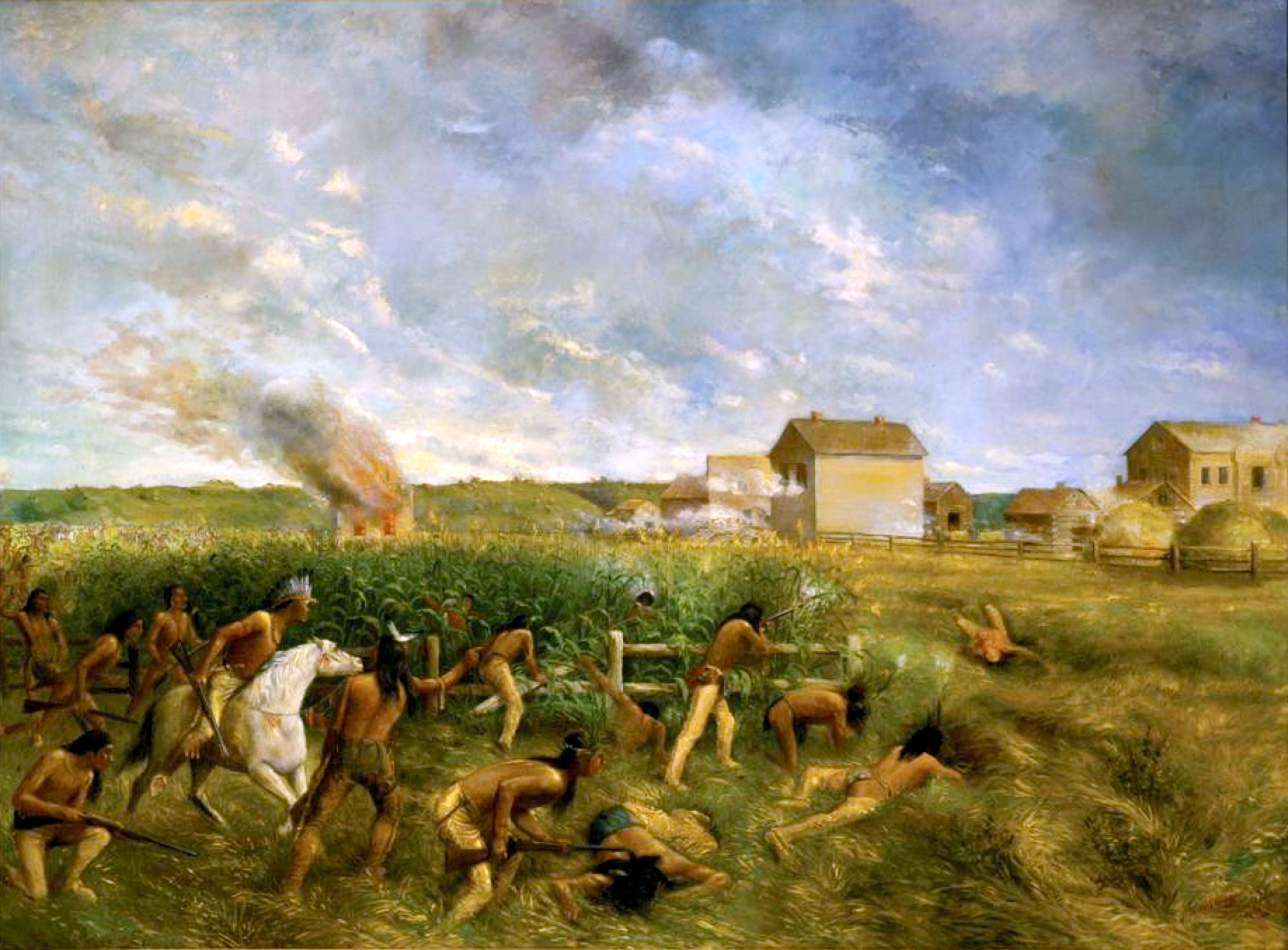
Anton Gag's 1904 painting "Attack on New Ulm"

In 1851, the Santee Dakota people of Minnesota had been forced to cede to the government their lands of 24,000,000 acres (97,000 km^{2}) under the terms of the Treaty of Traverse des Sioux. In 1852, they were moved into a reservation on the Minnesota River. In 1858, the U.S. government additionally purchased the half of the reservation lying north of the Minnesota River for $555,000, to be paid out annually over fifty years. The vast majority of the money was instead stolen by the Indian agents entrusted by the government to distribute it. Following several years of poor harvests, by 1862 the Dakota faced starvation if they did not receive the money they were owed.

When Chief Little Crow complained that despite stacks of provisions in clear sight, theirs by treaty, and that his people had nothing to eat, trader Andrew Myrick responded, "So far as I'm concerned ... let them eat grass or their own dung". Minnesota political leaders, led by Governor Alexander Ramsey, in league with commercial interests, advocated expelling all Dakota from Minnesota.

On August 17, 1862, four young Dakota men killed five white settlers near Acton. Realizing the gravity of the situation, the Dakota convened a war council that night. After much debate a faction led by Little Crow resolved to declare war the next day, with the aim of driving all whites out of the Minnesota River valley. On the morning of August 18 they attacked the Lower Sioux Agency, beginning the Dakota War.

== First Battle of New Ulm ==
Also on the morning August 18, 1862, Dakota warriors attacked Milford Township, Minnesota, killing 53 civilians and wounding many more. A sixteen-man recruiting party for Civil War volunteers that had left New Ulm that morning was ambushed in Milford; the five survivors arrived back at New Ulm at noon bearing news of an impending attack.

New Ulm Sheriff Charles Roos rushed with a few men to Milford, assuming that only a few drunk Dakota were responsible. After finding mutilated corpses and being fired upon, Roos realized that the attacks were much more serious than initially thought and returned to New Ulm. Upon arriving in New Ulm, he wrote to Governor Ramsey requesting immediate aid.

In the meantime Franz Czeigowitz, a former Austrian soldier and New Ulm resident, organized about 50 poorly armed citizens into a defensive militia. The militia had 12 rifles; the rest of the men were armed with shotguns, other poor-quality firearms and farm tools. Roos soon turned over command to Jacob Nix, a veteran of revolutionary fighting in the revolutions of 1848 in Europe. The townspeople erected barricades on the streets and sent the women and children into three brick buildings.

The first attack came on August 19, with about 100 Dakota warriors firing on the city from the bluff behind the town. According to Sheriff Roos, they were led by Joseph Godfrey, a former slave who had taken wives from Little Crow's band and Wakute's village. Under the command of Nix, a small number of civilians returned the fire. Later in the day, a thunderstorm discouraged the Dakota from continuing their attack, and there were no leaders present to give orders.

The first attack ended with six settlers killed and five wounded.

== Second Battle of New Ulm ==
Shortly after the first attack, Charles Eugene Flandrau and a relief force from St. Peter and Le Sueur reached New Ulm. The detachment included doctors Asa W. Daniels, Otis Ayer, and William Worrall Mayo. Mayo and William R. McMahan of Mankato set up a hospital in the Dacotah House and Ayer and Daniels set up a hospital in a store across the street. The people of New Ulm quickly named Flandrau their military commander.

Flandrau's forces were bolstered by about a hundred men from Mankato, two companies from Le Sueur, and militias from Brown County, Nicollet County, St. Peter, Lafayette, and New Ulm. In all, Flandrau had about three hundred citizen-soldiers under his command, but most were poorly armed. More than a thousand settlers were barricaded on New Ulm's main street.

On Saturday, August 23, around 9:30 in the morning, the Dakota began their second attack on the city. The defenders attempted to form a defensive picket line several blocks west of town. The Dakota "uttered a terrific yell" and advanced in U-shaped formation, holding their fire until the defenders shot first. The outnumbered defenders quickly retreated in disorder to the barricades in the town center; the numerically superior Dakota soon encircled the entire town. Captain William B. Dodd, second in command, was killed near the log blacksmith shop while leading soldiers beyond one of the barricades in an attempt to link up with a supposed reinforcement column - in reality, a body of Dakota masquerading as militia.

At the climax of the second battle a large body of Dakota used the terrain to mask their movement below the lower terrace and into buildings flanking the town's barricades, from which they could direct devastating enfilade fire against the town's defenders. Realizing the seriousness of the situation, Flandrau and Nix led a charge out of the barricades down Minnesota Street and swept away the advancing Dakota.

During the night a new and more compact defensive line was built around the town, and Flandrau ordered the burning of the remaining buildings outside of barricades. In all, 190 structures were destroyed, leaving only 49 residences for 2,500 people. The next morning, August 24, the Dakota reappeared, fired some harmless long-range shots, and then withdrew. Flandrau convened with his officers later that day and decided to evacuate the city (despite objections by Nix and others), due to a shortage of ammunition and food and the outbreaks of disease.

On August 25, 1862, 2000 people, including 153 wagons, evacuated from New Ulm to Mankato, escorted by about 150 men; the group made it to Mankato without incident.

William Watts Folwell, a Minnesota historian, remarked, "This was no sham battle, no trivial affair, but a heroic defense of a beleaguered town against a much superior force."

== Flandrau's forces at New Ulm ==
(Note several other units were under Flandrau's command {Captain H.W.Holley's Company of "Winnebago Guards"; Captain C.I. Post Company of "Fillmore County Volunteer Mounted Infantry"; Captain N.P. Colburn Company of Fillmore County Volunteer Militia; Captain C.F. Buck's Company of "Winona Rangers"; Captain D.L. Davis "Goodhue County Rangers"} served under his command at the Southern Frontier.

- Captain Flandrau's Company:
  - Killed: Lt William Ladd; Privates: Max Heach; Jerry Quane {?} {Indistinct writing};
  - Wounded:Privates: Ed Andrews; W.C. Estlar; Wm Langharst; George Moser;
  - Sick: Private: H.Harm
- Captain Bierbaur's Mankato Company:
  - Killed: Privates: N.E. Houghton; Wm Nicolson;
  - Wounded: Privates:Geo Andrews; F.M. Andrews; Patrick Burns;John Fassat; Adam Freundler
- 1st Battalion Brown County Militia: {Company B under Captain Ignatz Reinartz Company served at New Ulm Sept 15 to Oct 15, 1862; Lt. Charles Wagner Company C "Irregular State Militia" of New Ulm served from Sept 15 to Oct 10, 1862. Private John Armstrong killed }:
- Captain Charles Roos Company "A":
  - Wounded: Privates: John Peller; Louis Schmitz
- Captain Louis Buggert's Company {Brown County Militia}:
- Captain A.M Bean's Company {Nicollet County}:
- Captain William Dellaughter's Company "Le Sueur Tigers No 1":
  - Killed: 1st Lt. A. M. Edwards; Private: William Luskey; Luke Smithson {Wounded and died}
  - Wounded: Private: John Smith
- Captain A.E. Saunders's Company "Le Sueur Tigers No 2":
  - Killed: 5th Sergeant Wm Maloney; Privates: M. Aherin; Wm Kulp;
  - Wounded: Captain A.E Saunders {Severely}; 4th Corporal Thomas Howard {Slightly in hip};
- Lt. William Huey's Company "St Peter {Nicollet County} Guards:
- Captain Sidel Depolder's "Lafayette Company"
- Captain John Belm's Company of 11th Regiment/3rd Brigade/Minnesota Militia:
  - Killed: Privates: Jacob Castor; Eagland; Julis Kirchstein; Malbeans Mayer; John C. Michaels; August Roepke; Leopold Senzke;
  - Died of Wounds: Privates: G.W.Otto Barth; Adolph Stumple {Died in St Paul};
  - Wounded: Privates: L. Fay; R.Fischer; Julius Guething; William Guething; George Guetlich;Hess; Hansmann; Herriman; de:Daniel Schillock; August Westphal;

In August 1862, the following units relieved New Ulm:

- Captain Joseph Anderson Company of Mounted Men "The Cullen Guard"
- Captain E/St. Julian Cox Company of "The Frontier Avengers"

September 1862: 1st Battalion Brown County Militia:

- Captain Ignatz Reinartz Company "B" served at New Ulm Sept 15 to Oct 15, 1862;
- Lt. Charles Wagner Company C "Irregular State Militia" of New Ulm served from Sept 15 to Oct 10, 1862. Casualty: Private John Armstrong killed.

== Sources ==
- Carley, Kenneth (1976). The Sioux Uprising of 1862 (Second ed.). Minnesota Historical Society. ISBN 0-87351-103-4.
- Clodfelter, Micheal (2006) The Dakota War: The United States Army Versus the Sioux 1862-1865 McFarland & Company ISBN 978-0-7864-2726-0
- Gebhard, Darla Cordes, Isch, John (2012) Eight Days in August: The Accounts of the Casualties and Survivors in Brown County During the U.S-Dakota War of 1862 Brown County Historical Society ISBN 978-0-9765095-6-1
- Lass, William E. (1998) [1977]. Minnesota: A History (2nd ed.). New York, NY: W.W. Norton & Company. ISBN 0-393-04628-1.
- Kaplan, Fred (2008). Lincoln: The Biography of a Writer. Harper Collins. p. 342. ISBN 978-0-06-077334-2.
- Tolzmann, Don Heinrich, ed. (2007). Memories of the Battle of New Ulm : Personal Accounts of the Sioux Uprising [in] L.A. Fritsche's History of Brown County, Minnesota (1916). Bowie, Md.: Heritage Books. ISBN 978-0-7884-1863-1.
