= Medicine Bottle (Mdewakanton) =

Dakota medicine man (c. 1831 – 1865)

- Waḳáƞ Ożáƞżaƞ
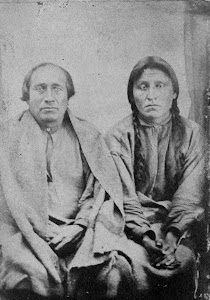
- Shakopee III (left) and Medicine Bottle (right) at Fort Snelling in November, 1865
- Pronunciation: Wa-kan O-jan-jan
- Born: c.1831 Mendota, Minnesota
- Died: November 11, 1865; Fort Snelling St. Paul, Minnesota
- Cause of death: Hanging
- Other name: Holy Light
- Occupation: Medicine Man
- Relatives: Big Eagle (brother)

Medicine Bottle also called Holy Light (Dakota: Waḳáƞ Ożáƞżaƞ; c. 1831 – November 11, 1865) was Mdewakanton Dakota medicine man accused of taking part in the Dakota War of 1862. Medicine Bottle is one of the two other Dakota men including Shakopee III who were executed in 1865 for allegedly partaking in the Dakota Uprising three years prior along with the other main 38 Dakota men who were killed in the 1862 Mankato mass execution.

== Early life ==
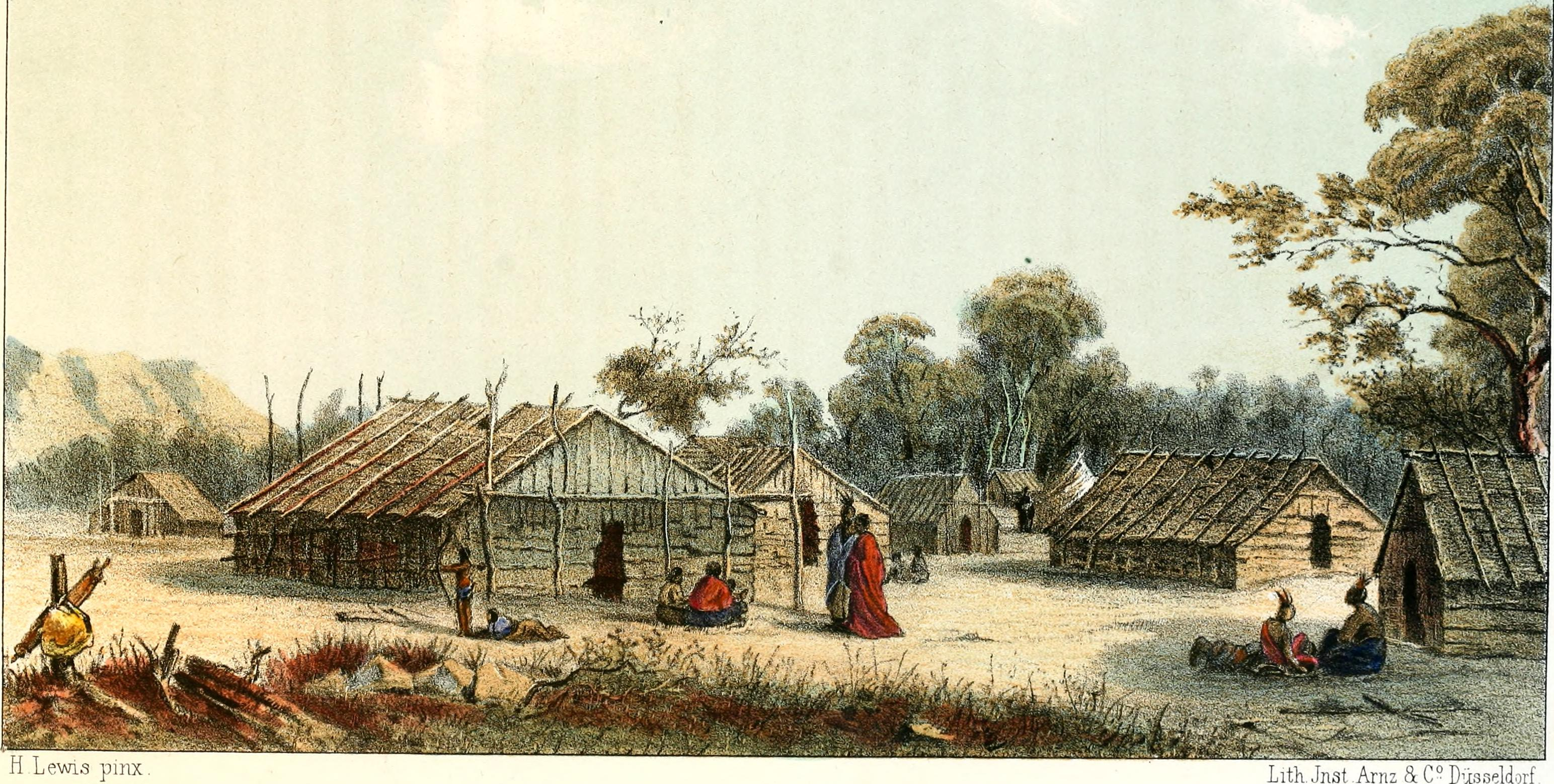
The village of Waḳáƞ Ożáƞżaƞ (Medicine Bottle) on the Mississippi River (at present-day Pine Bend).

Medicine Bottle was born in 1831 near Mendota, Minnesota and belonged to the Mdewakanton community, a sub-tribe of the Dakota people native to the region of the Minnesota River Valley. Medicine Bottle was the nephew of Waḳáƞ Ożáƞżaƞ, a tribal elder of the Mdewakanton at Pine Bend, and the younger brother of Big Eagle who was later an instrumental leader during the 1862 uprising. Not much is known about Medicine Bottle's early life. Previous to being called Medicine Bottle by English settlers, he was known as Waḳáƞ Ożáƞżaƞ (Holy/ Sacred Light) after having a vision quest (Dakota: Haŋbdéc̣eyapi) and working as a tribal medicine man.

Like many of the Dakota, Medicine Bottle was displaced to the Lower Sioux Indian Reservation after a series of land cession treaties with the Government of the United States including both the Treaty of Mendota and Treaty of Traverse des Sioux. The Treaty of Mendota stipulated that the Mdewakanton and Wahpekute bands were to receive US $1,410,000 in gold annuity payments in return for relocating to the Lower Sioux Agency on the Minnesota River near present-day Morton, Minnesota along with giving up their rights to a significant portion of southern Minnesota. With the signing of the Treaty of Mendota along with the earlier Treaty of Traverse des Sioux (10 Stat. 949), most of southern Minnesota became open to white settlement.

=== Name ===
Medicine Bottle’s English name is an inexact translation of his original Dakota name Waḳáƞ Ożáƞżaƞ, which might be more precisely translated as "Sacred Light". Waḳáƞ is a word with no direct English counterpart and a range of meanings that include sacredness, mystery or spiritual power and significance. It is often translated as "medicine", although the direct Dakota counterpart to the English noun "medicine" is instead p̣eżúta. Ożáƞżaƞ refers to light or illumination, but sounds very similar to żaƞżáƞ, a word for glass or a glass bottle.

== Involvement in the Dakota Uprising ==
Medicine Bottle among many other Dakota took part in an uprising under Chief Little Crow. Several Dakota eyewitness accounts claim that Medicine Bottle, along with Little Crow, Big Eagle, Chief Mankato, and Shakopee III took part in several of the key engagements of the uprising including the Battle of Fort Ridgely and the Battle of Birch Coulee. Furthermore, Medicine Bottle was specifically accused of the murder of Philander Prescott, a trader and interpreter at the Lower Sioux Agency during the Attack at the Lower Sioux Agency on August 18,1862. Whether Medicine Bottle actually participated in these engagements though is questionable as eyewitness accounts were typically pressured by the prosecution into making forced confessions during Shakopee and Medicine Bottles trials in 1864.

One reputable account of Medicine Bottle comes from Lightning Blanket, a Dakota man who took part in the uprising tells a narrative in Gary Anderson's Through Dakota Eyes: Narrative Accounts of the Minnesota Indian War of 1862. Lightning Blanket states the following in his account:

"Little Crow with several of his chiefs, Pazuta Zha (Medicine Bottle), Shakopada (Little Six) and Wamada Donka (Big Eagle) favored the attack on these two places, but the other two chiefs, Wapasha (Wabasha) and Wapecouta (Leaf Shooter), would not agree, because Wabasha was jealous of Little Crow".

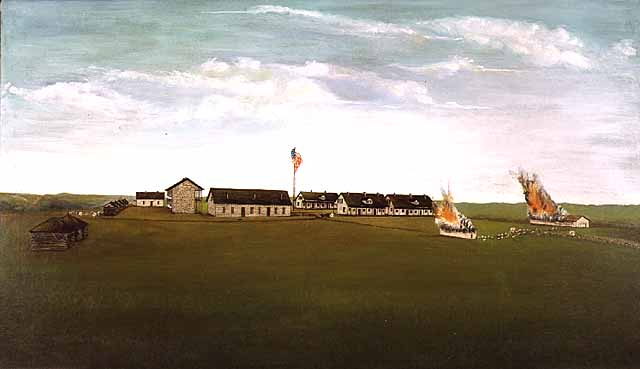
Oil painting depicting Fort Ridgely in 1890.

Lightning blanket later states that Medicine Bottle and his men were to be used as a reconnaissance force against the military installation at Fort Ridgely which had been left in the care of Lieutenant Timothy J. Sheehan. Medicine Bottle and his men were to "draw the attention and fire of the soldiers" so that the Dakota forces in the east under Big Eagle, along with Little Crow and Little Six's forces to the south and west could rush in and capture the fort. Medicine Bottle's signal to attack was "three big shots" (volley fire) which would signal Little Crow, Big Eagle, and Little Six to commence the attack. In the ensuing Battle of Fort Ridgely Little Crow's forces were defeated by the small 210-men garrison despite having superior numbers and the element of surprise. Following Little Crow's defeat at the Battle of Wood Lake Medicine Bottle fled along with many other Dakota People to Canada.

== Refugee and Kidnapping ==
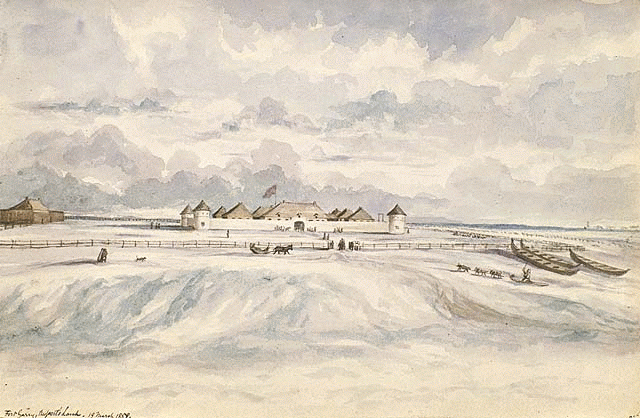
Upper Fort Garry by George Seton in 1858.

Medicine Bottle, like many of the Dakota, fled north across the international border to the Red River Colony (today a part of the Canadian province of Manitoba) in Rupert's Land, at the time still a part of British North America. Many of the refugees found refuge at Fort Garry, while others encamped near the Métis settlement of St. Joseph in Dakota Territory (now part of Walhalla, North Dakota). Among the refugees at Fort Garry was Chief Shakopee who also declared that he would stay in Fort Garry.

=== Minnesota Government's Response ===
Governor of Minnesota Alexander Ramsey in the meantime had been raising several mobile United States Volunteer forces to deal with the aftermath of the Dakota Uprising; namely the 1st Minnesota Cavalry Regiment, the 2nd Minnesota Cavalry Regiment, one of the other smaller units raised at the time was a mounted infantry force known as Hatch's Minnesota Cavalry Battalion led by Edwin Aaron Clark Hatch of St. Paul. Hatch's Battalion was raised with the explicit purpose of guarding the border of Minnesota along the border with both the Dakota Territory and the Canadian territory of Rupert's Land from any escaping or invading Dakota. Hatch's Battalion was headquartered at Pembina and had been in communication with Canadian authorities including the Governor of Fort Garry, Andrew Bannatyne and the Governor of Rupert's Land Alexander Grant Dallas who both gave Hatch exclusive permission to cross the boundary if necessary to stop any violence or bloodshed. Dallas even offered the Dakota rations, firearms, and ammunition if the Dakota would simply leave the fort.

=== Kidnapping ===
On Christmas Day, 1863, a Lieutenant from Hatch's Battalion crossed the Canadian border into the Red River Colony to speak with the authorities of Fort Garry about retrieving Shakopee and Medicine Bottle. Legally speaking they were untouchable as they could not be extradited as refugees, however, similar to the Trent Affair, a blind eye was often turned on such affairs during the time.

Hatch's Lieutenant met with the battalion's guide, a fur trader from Ontario named John Hamilton McKenzie (also spelled Mackenzie) in order to inform him that there was a substantial financial reward if he succeeded in the capture of the two Dakota leaders. Sometime later, a Captain from the battalion informed McKenzie that Andrew Bannatyne, who supplied the battalion with horse feed, would be willing to assist by providing teams to transport the entire band of Dakota across the border to Pembina. On January 15, 1864, McKenzie and his colleague Onisime Giguere traveled 25 miles up the Assiniboine River to the Sioux encampment. The next day, they met with the chiefs and misinformed them that the British colonial authorities would stop providing them with rations. Little Six became upset, and said he would need to speak to the governor of Rupert's Land and the bishop at once.

McKenzie and Giguiere offered Little Six and Medicine Bottle a ride to Fort Garry if they left right away. Around midnight, they had supper and a jug of toddy at McKenzie's house. The following day was Sunday, and the chiefs were asked to respect the Sabbath by staying home. McKenzie provided them with more toddy combined with laudanum which had been provided by Bannatyne. They then went to Bannatyne's house, where they were given a glass of wine laced with laudanum. That afternoon, they "went into the spree in good earnest, on raw whiskey made of alcohol." McKenzie pretended to be worried about giving them too much to drink, while refilling Giguiere's glass mostly with water.

Little Six became unconscious at around 9:00pm. To prevent him from waking up, Bannatyne put a handkerchief soaked in chloroform to his nose. They tied his hands and feet, and strapped Little Six to a "flat dog sled" lined with buffalo robes. McKenzie then set off for Pembina with Little Six in tow. Medicine Bottle, who was only in his mid-thirties, was less intoxicated. They struggled for a while to bind and strap him onto another sled. Giguere then set off for Pembina with Medicine Bottle in tow. Bannatyne had provided the men with a relief of horses.

At noon the next day, they arrived in Pembina and delivered Little Six and Medicine Bottle to Major Hatch, who promptly arrested them. Hatch's battalion took Little Six and Medicine Bottle first to Fort Abercrombie, then finally to Fort Snelling, where they arrived on May 27, 1864.

== Trial and Execution ==
=== Trial at Fort Snelling ===
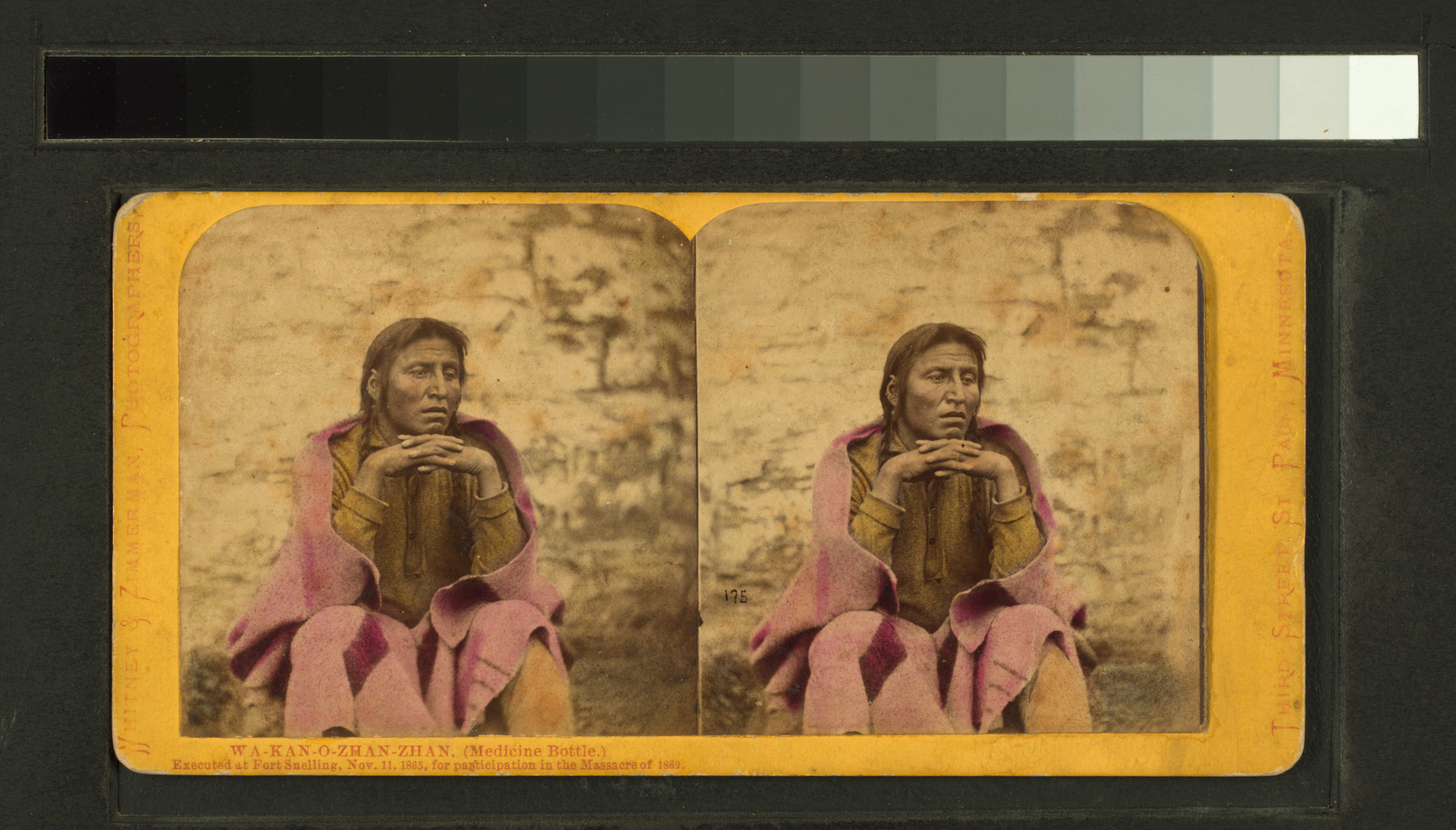
Medicine Bottle at Fort Snelling c.1864-1865

On November 18, 1864, General Henry Hastings Sibley issued an order for a military commission to conduct the trials of Little Six and Medicine Bottle at Fort Snelling. The trials had been delayed because most of Sibley's commissioned officers had either been assigned to frontier military posts, or were detached for General Alfred Sully's expedition. The panel of officers he finally selected for the military commission all came from a single regiment, the 2nd Minnesota Cavalry Regiment, before it had completed a year of service.

According to William Watts Folwell, author of A History of Minnesota from 1921:

"Medicine Bottle was arraigned on November 25 on two charges, murder and participation in the outbreak of 1862. The specifications to the first charge were: (i) the killing of Philander Prescott by shooting; (2) the same with slight variation; (3) the shooting of sundry white people in wagons and other vehicles near New Ulm; (4) the killing of white persons in Brown, Renville, and other counties; and (5) the shooting and killing of sundry soldiers. To the second charge there were three specifications: (i) a mere repetition of the charge; (2) the discharging of a gun into an inhabited house in Brown County with intent to kill; and (3) the killing of sundry white persons in wagons or other vehicles near New Ulm. The prisoner was allowed two days to employ counsel, but on the reassemblage of the commission on November 28 he had none to introduce".

Five witnesses were sworn in for the prosecution, 3 men and 2 women. In regard to the murder of Philander Prescott, multiple witnesses stated that they knew nothing about who murdered Prescott, only what they had heard as hearsay from others. Ultimately, Medicine Bottle did not cross-examine, at the close of the testimony he was allowed 24 hours to prepare his defense. Medicine Bottle's written statement rejected the jurisdiction of the military commission and the legality of his kidnapping. Furthermore, Medicine Bottle stated that he had fled to Rupert's Land as soon as possible in order to be away from the warlike portion of his tribe. Medicine Bottle's papers were signed by both Willis A. Gorman and Cushman K. Davis who stated that "No government can acquire right by its own wrong or by the wrong of any of its citizens. No state can reach over into the domain of a foreign and neutral power and drag from its protection any criminal by force. The flagrancy of the original crime does not abridge his rights". On December 2 the commission found Medicine Bottle guilty of both charges and of all the specifications except that of willfully killing soldiers and sentenced him to death.

=== Execution ===
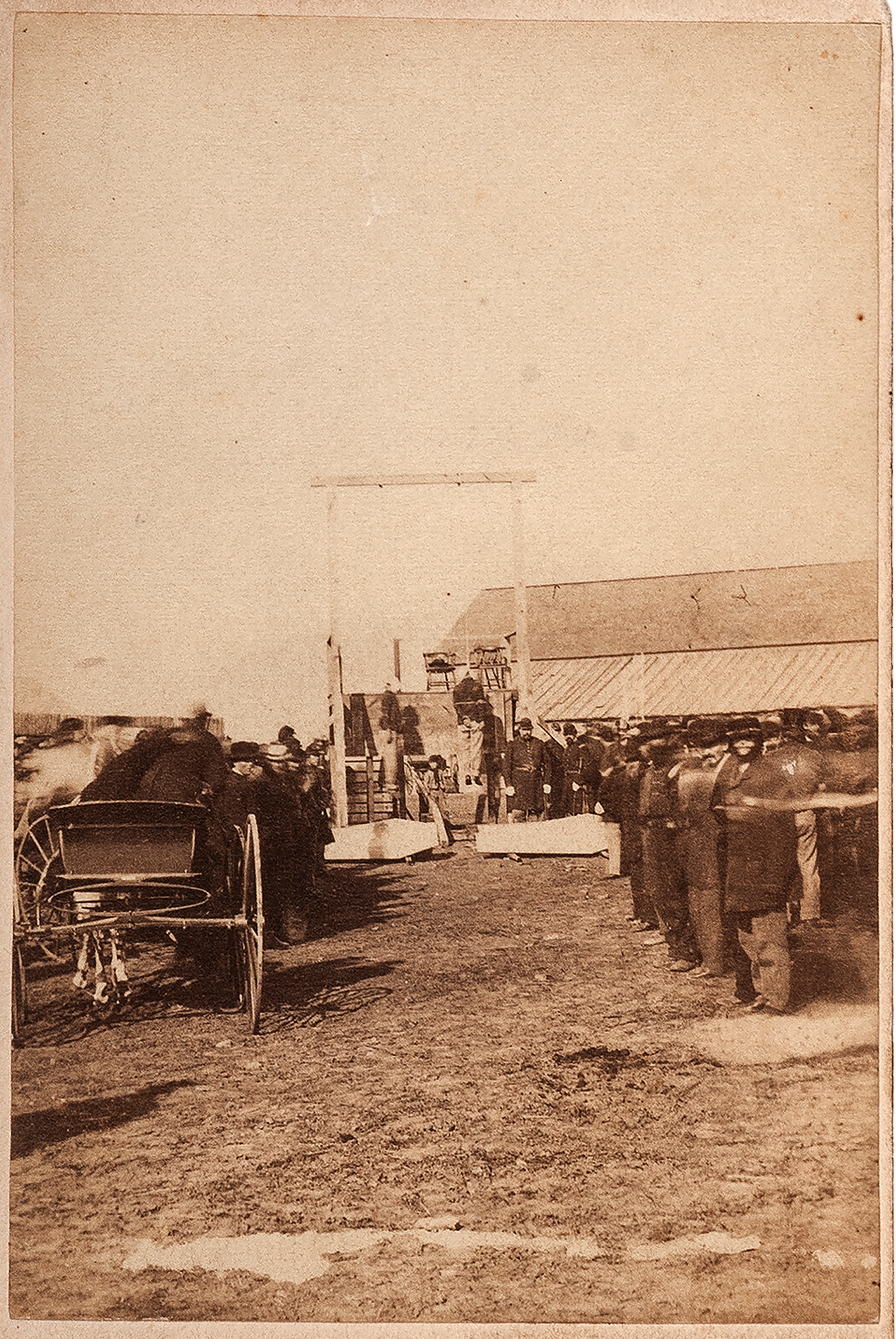
Hanging of Little Six and Medicine Bottle CDV, 1865.

Both Shakopee and Medicine Bottle were executed by hanging on November 11, 1865 with a crowd of onlookers. Previous to their execution both Medicine Bottle and Shakopee had deathbed conversions to Catholicism. Father Augustin Ravoux, who had previously served as a missionary at the Lac qui Parle Mission, also served as spiritual adviser to Little Six and Medicine Bottle. Both men were executed as 12:00pm to a crowd of more than 400 citizens of St. Paul with a military formation of 425 soldiers.

=== Aftermath ===
After the hangings, some witnesses ran up to the gallows to cut off pieces of the nooses to keep as souvenirs. At some point after the execution, the bodies of Little Six and Medicine Bottle were acquired by doctors in Saint Paul, Minnesota. According to Dakota researcher and filmmaker Sheldon Wolfchild, Shakopee's body was preserved in a wooden whisky barrel and sent to Jefferson Medical College in Philadelphia, where it was used by Professor Joseph Pancoast for his lessons in human anatomy. In 1867, the Minnesota Legislature approved $1,000 to be paid for the services and expenses of John H. McKenzie and Onisime Giguere in the capture of Little Six and Medicine Bottle. The whereabouts of the remains of Medicine Bottle are still unknown today.

== Legacy ==
Both Shakopee and Medicine Bottle are remembered via the "Healing Ride", which is performed by some Dakota and Lakota people, along with the Dakota "38 plus 2" horse ride. The "38" refers to the original 38 men who were executed by hanging in Mankato, Minnesota, while the "plus 2" refers to the execution of Shakopee III and Medicine Bottle at Fort Snelling in 1865.
