= Hatch's Minnesota Cavalry Battalion =

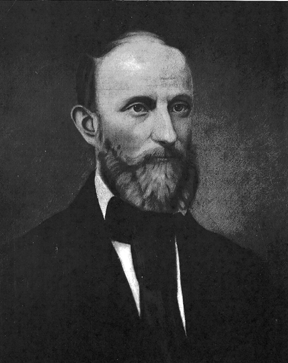
- Major Edwin Aaron Clark Hatch, commander of the Battalion from 1863-1864
- Active: July 25, 1863 to June 22, 1866 f
- Countries: Canada and the United States of America
- Allegiance: Union Army
- Branch: Cavalry
- Engagements: Sioux Wars; Skirmish near St. Joseph

Commanders
- Major: Edwin Aaron Clark Hatch
- Lieutenant Colonel: Charles Powell Adams
- Major: Henning Von Minden

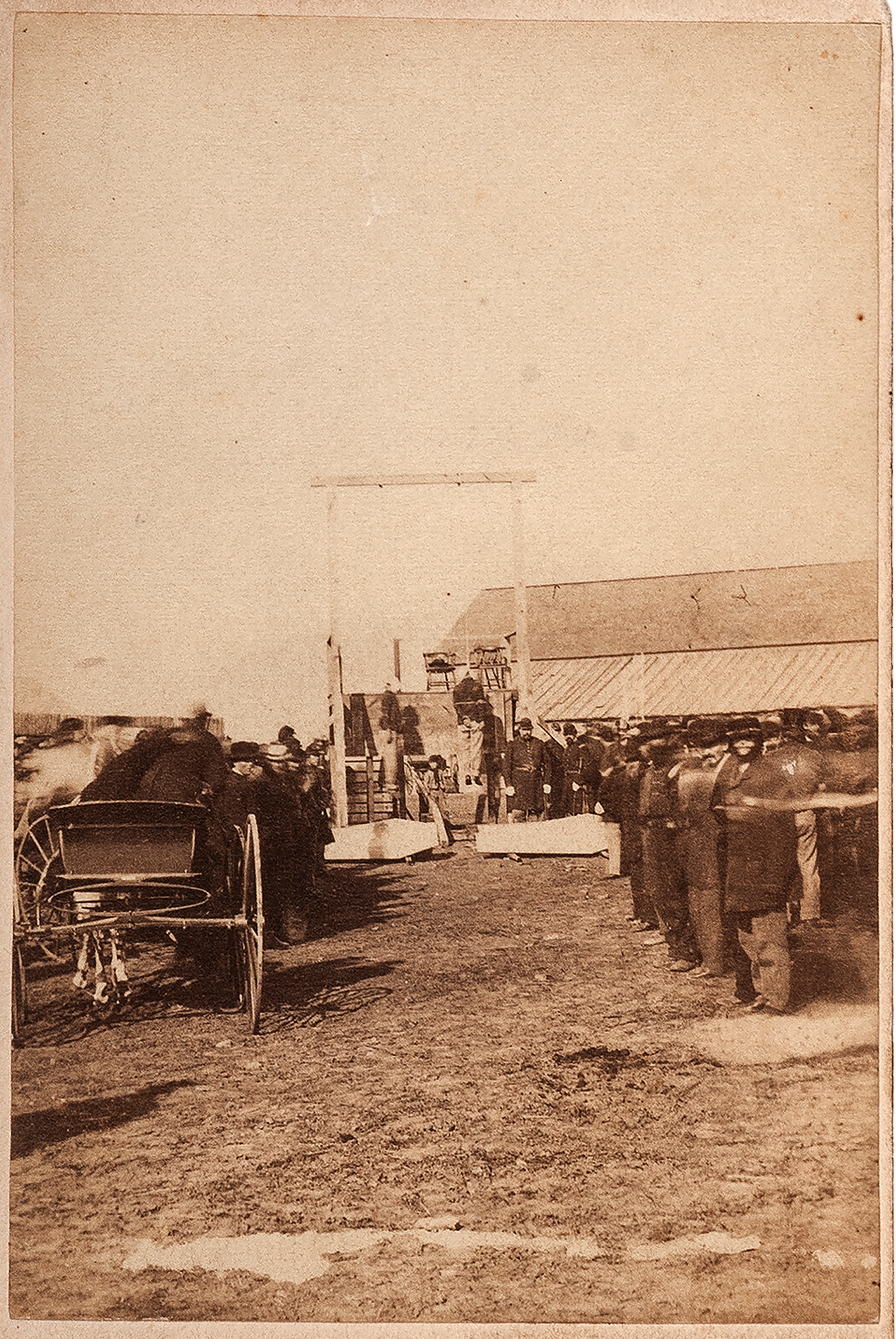
Hanging of Little Six and Medicine Bottle CDV, 1865

Hatch's Independent Battalion of Minnesota Cavalry or Hatch's Battalion was a Minnesota USV cavalry battalion that served in the Union Army during the American Civil War and American Indian Wars. The unit was primarily made up of volunteers from the states of Minnesota and Wisconsin, as well as volunteers from the Dakota Territory and Canada.

== Service ==
The unit's formation was a product of the Mdewakanton uprising in August 1862. Very quickly nearly every band of Chippewa offered to fight the Sioux for the U.S. Government. First two Wisconsin chiefs sent a letter to President Lincoln with the offer. Then on 15 September 22 chiefs did the same at the Crow Wing Indian Agency. Both of Minnesota's U.S. Senators and Governor Ramsey thought the Chippewa should be taken up on their offers. A week later 40 odd Chippewa leaders from nearly every band in Minnesota, plus a couple from Wisconsin, arrived in St Paul at Gov. Ramsey's invite. At that time everyone learned that Major general Pope commander of the Department of the Northwest did not want "Indians" in his command as a matter of "public policy". Over the winter the politicians decided to go directly to the Secretary of War Stanton. They proposed a mounted unit of 1000 "auxiliary Chippewa warriors", on "Indian ponys", commanded E.A.C. Hatch, that reported directly to the War Department. It was envisioned as an independent command, functioning "solely" for the prosecution of the Indian War. Pope had issues with most of the proposal and had enough rank to get it modified. The result was a mounted unit that reported to his command, solely for the Indian war, with only a few Native Americans in its ranks. To get volunteers a $40.00 bounty was advertised in the papers. The Battalion was Minnesota's last Civil War unit to stand down. Major Hatch sent letters to the media with the letterhead "Indian Battalion of Minnesota Volunteers".

Chippewa Chief Hole in the Day offered Brig. General Sibley 600 warriors for his 1863 expedition into the Dakota Territory and was turned down. A month later he made an offer to Major Hatch. Hatch had to refuse because of Pope. Hole-in the-day told the newspapers that Hatch was the right man for the command. In 1865 newspapers reported that Hole-in-the-Day regretted not having been able to raise the Chippewa battalion for Major Hatch.

Company	Primary Location of Recruitment	Earliest Captain
A	Ramsey County, Rice County, Goodhue County, and Hennepin County	Allen Truman Chamblin
B	Hennepin County, Meeker County, Wright County, Dakota County, and Winona County	George Carlos Whitcomb
C	Dakota County, Hennepin County, and Goodhue County	Abel Grovenor
D	Ramsey County, St. Joseph, Pembina, and others.	Hugh S. Donaldson
E	Hennepin County, Anoka County, Wright County and Stearns County	George Boyd Jr.
F	Dakota County, Wright County, Ramsey County, and Hennepin County	Edward Oakford

Hatch's Battalion was organized at Fort Snelling and St. Paul, Minnesota, with Companies A, B, C, and D being mustered in from July 25, to September, 1863. The majority of soldiers in the battalion came from the southern and central counties of Minnesota, others however, came from Fort Garry in Canada, as well as Métis communities in both the Red River Colony and Dakota Territory. General Pope created a line of defense in the war's theater of operations starting at Sioux City, Iowa, through Minnesota to Fort Abercrombie, Dakota Territory and north to the international border. In early January 1864 several men of the battalion were chosen to go on a scouting mission to the settlement of Saint Joseph (St. Jo) in Dakota Territory as several Sioux were spotted in that direction. A squadron of 12-15 men under the command of Lieutenant William F. Cross left Pembina around 11:00pm towards St. Joseph, some 35 miles away. The squadron saw no activity of Sioux in the vicinity of St. Joseph but found several supposed Sioux encamped in a ravine in the mountains nearby. The first Indian that was seen coming out of a lodge was fired upon and killed, a total of 5 Indians were killed, 3 men and 2 women, all of which were scalped. The squadron returned to Pembina having marched some 80 miles in two nights.

In May, 1864 the battalion was posted the northern section of the line with Hq posted to Fort Abercrombie along with Companies A and B assigned to the Fort's garrison, Company C moved to the stockades at Alexandria and Pomme de Terre, while Company D was sent north to Fort Pembina. The 2nd Minn Cavalry had the line south of them to near the Iowa border. The battalion was increased in size when Company E was mustered on August 31, 1864, and again when Company F was mustered on September 1, 1864. In October 1864 Major Hatch received orders from Fort Snelling to retrieve Sioux leaders who had crossed into lands of the British Crown owned by the Hudson's Bay Company (HBC). Companies A, B, C, and D headed to Pembina, Dakota Territory, the first week of October in 1863 but winter set in before they reached Pembina. Hatch made an encampment, sending 20 men across the border to meet a HBC trader named John McKenzie. The troop encountered and killed Minnesota Sioux at St. Joseph 15km across the border. At Fort Garry two Mdewakanton leaders were drugged by McKenzie. They were bound to dogsleds and taken to Hatch's men at the border for Minnesota's $1000.00 bounty. The killings at St. Joseph caused almost 400 Sioux to turn themselves in to Hatch as well. Hatch messaged Gen. Pope for instructions and was told he was not to make treaty with them, their surrender was unconditional. When conditions allowed, Hatch accompanied the prisoners back to Fort Snelling. The two chiefs were hung for crimes against unarmed civilians. They were Little Six (Taoyteduta Shakopee) and Medicine Bottle (Wakanozanzan). Those Sioux that turned themselves in were sent to Crow Creek Reservation. Hatch left military service in June. On 15 July Lt. Col. C. Powell Adams, ex-1st Minnesota's assumed command. He was in the 1st Minnesota's Gettysburg charge. In 1865 newspapers reported that Hole-in-the-Day regretted not having been able to raise the Chippewa for the battalion for Major Hatch. The battalion was mustered out between April 26 and June 22, 1866, bringing an end to Minnesota's response to the 1862 Uprising and were Minnesota's last men to put down their swords of war.

== Commander ==
- Major Edwin Aaron Clark (E.A.C.) Hatch - September 30, 1863 to June 1864
- Lieutenant Colonel Charles Powell Adams - July 15, 1864 to June 22, 1866

== Casualties and total strength ==
Hatch's Minnesota Cavalry Battalion did not lose any men who were killed or who died of wounds received in battle, but did have between 21 enlisted men who died of disease, froze to death, or were imprisoned, for a total of 21 fatalities.

These confirmed fatalities were:

- Private John Munger of Company A - Died of disease on March 8, 1864 at Pembina, Dakota Territory.
- Private Joseph Gagne Jr. of Company C - Died of Disease on April 24. 1864 at Pembina, Dakota Territory.
- Private Charles M. Stowe of Company A - Died of disease on July 22, 1864 at Fort Abercrombie, Dakota Territory.
- Private Charles M.B. Hatch of Company C - Died of disease on June 3, 1865 at Alexandria, Minnesota.
- Private William Riley of Company D - Died of disease on June 3, 1864.
- Private Joseph Hankerson of Company A - Died of disease on September 19, 1863 at Minneapolis, Minnesota.
- Private John Turner of Company A - Died of disease on September 2, 1863 at Fort Snelling, St. Paul, Minnesota.
- Private Charles D. Maybee of Company B - Died of disease on March 30, 1864 at Pembina, Dakota Territory.
- Private Marvin Carry of Company C - Died of disease on October 8, 1863 at Fort Snelling, St. Paul, Minnesota.
- Private John Tibbetts of Company C - Died of disease on December 16, 1865 at Pomme de Terre, Minnesota.
- Private John Druey of Company A - Died of disease on October 3, 1864 at Georgetown, Minnesota.
- Private Samuel P. Hall of Company A - Died of disease on October 15, 1863 at Minnetonka, Minnesota.
- Private Edward Stam of Company F - Died of disease on September 18, 1865 at Fort Snelling, St. Paul, Minnesota.
- Private Luman Putnam of Company B - Died of disease on October 3, 1863 at Fort Snelling, St. Paul, Minnesota.
- Private Frederick Miller of Company C - Died on May 11, 1865.
- Private Halvar Sjolee (Halvor Sjøli) of Company F - Died on October 19, 1865 at Fort Snelling, St. Paul, Minnesota.
- Private Michael Carland of Company D - Died on May 18, 1864 at Fort Abercrombie, Dakota Territory.
- Private John B. Scott of Company F - Died on March 3, 1865 at Hastings, Minnesota.
- Commissary Sergeant Henry C. Knapp of Company F - Died on July 30, 1865 at Fort Snelling, St. Paul, Minnesota.
- Private James T. Kirby of Company C - Frozen to death on December 10, 1864 at Pomme de Terre, Minnesota.
- Private Joseph Smetiana (Smitana) of Company E - Sent to Insane Asylum on January 23, 1866.

== Notable people ==
- Edwin Aaron Clark Hatch - The commander and namesake of the battalion. Hatch was an Indian agent, fur trader, and clerk for the Ho-Chunk, Dakota, Ojibwe, and Blackfoot Confederacy. Hatch was personal friends with Henry M. Rice and Morton S. Wilkinson who advocated for his command as Major. Hatch was also a close friend of Andrew Myrick who was killed during the Attack at the Lower Sioux Agency. Hatch resigned his command in June 1864 due to illness and worked for James J. Hill and the Great Northern Railway (U.S.). Hatch died in 1882 due to Cholera Morbus.
- Lyman S. Kidder - The son of Jefferson P. Kidder, Lyman served as a Private and was later promoted to First Sergeant in Company E. Lyman was later killed as a Lieutenant in 1867 in the Kidder fight.
- Charles K. Bucknum - An early Wyoming pioneer, Wyoming legislator, and Mayor of Capser. Bucknum, Wyoming is also named after him. Bucknum later served as a scout for Nelson A. Miles during the Nez Perce War. Bucknum had previously served as a Corporal in Company F.
- Charles Whippo Nash - The 6th Mayor of Des Moines, Iowa (1857), 1861 State Senator of Dakota County, Minnesota, and the 5th Grand Master Mason of the Minnesota (1867-1871).
- Charles Powell Adams - Minnesota Territorial House member, Senator in the Minnesota Legislature, Mayor of Hastings, and the Colonel of the 1st Minnesota Infantry Regiment. Adams was the replacement commander of the battalion after the resignation of Major Edwin Hatch in June 1864.
- Edward Dampier - Dampier was the 1st Lieutenant in Company F. Dampier's Smith carbine was used by Dr. Henry M. Wheeler to shoot Clell Miller of the James–Younger Gang during their 1876 robbery in Northfield, Minnesota. The carbine is still held by the Northfield Historical Society.
- John Hamilton MacKenzie - MacKeznie (McKenzie) was a fur trader and unofficial scout and guide for the battalion on its march to Pembina. MacKenzie was also most notably one of the primary men, along with Andrew Bannatyne, who were responsible for the extrajudicial kidnapping of the Mdewakanton Chief Shakopee III.
- Charles Henry Mix - The son of Charles Eli Mix, Mix was an Indian agent and clerk for the Ho-Chunk at Long Prairie. Mix was also the secretary for Willis A. Gorman as Territorial Governor. Mix was initially a 1st Lieutenant and later the Captain of Company A.
- Henning Von Minden - Originally from Schleswig-Holstein, Von Minden was a German immigrant and veteran of the First Schleswig War. Von Minden was the Captain of the 1st Independent "German" Company of the Minnesota Volunteers who served in Company G of the 5th Iowa Cavalry Regiment, originally nicknamed the "Curtis Horse Regiment" after Samuel Ryan Curtis. Henning and the 3 independent Minnesota companies were eventually detached from the 5th Iowa and were designated as Brackett's Battalion in February 25, 1864. By September 1864 Minden was the replacement Major and second-in-command of Hatch's Battalion, headquartered at Sauk Centre. Henning was a skilled cartographer and topographical engineer who later served as the chief draftsman for the Surveyor General of Minnesota in the immediate postwar. The Grand Army of the Republic Von Minden Post 105 in Jordan, Minnesota was named after him.

== Equipment ==
Hatch's Battalion was armed with a variety of weaponry throughout its service from 1863 to 1866, the following list are just some of the weapons they utilized:

- Model 1840 Cavalry Saber
- Model 1860 Light Cavalry Saber
- Remington Model 1858
- Colt Army Model 1860
- 1863 Starr Revolver
- Whitneyville Dragoon Revolver
- Sharps Carbine
- Burnside Carbine
- Smith Carbine
- Springfield Model 1855
- Springfield Model 1842

== See also ==
- List of Minnesota Civil War Units
