= Philander (name) =

Philander can be a given name or a surname.

Notable people with this given name include:

- Philander Chase (1775–1852), Episcopal Church bishop, educator, founder of Kenyon College, and pioneer of the United States western frontier
- Philander Claxton (1862–1957), American journalist
- Philander P. Humphrey (1823–1862), American physician and politician.
- Philander Chase Johnson (1866–1939), American journalist
- Philander C. Knox (1853–1921), American lawyer and politician
- Philander Prescott (1801–1862), American translator
- Philander Smith (1809–1882), American philanthropist and eponym of Philander Smith College
- Philander Stephens (1788–1861), Jacksonian member of the U.S. House of Representatives from Pennsylvania

Notable people with this surname include:

- David Philander (born 1987) Namibia rugby union player
- Luke Philander (born 1997), South African cricketer
- Pehr Philander (c. 1757–1811), Dutch slave
- Soli Philander (1961–2026), South African actor, director and television presenter
- Vernon Philander (born 1985), South African cricketer
- Wendy Philander (born 1976), South African politician

Mythological characters include:

- Philander (mythology), son of Apollo

== See also ==
- Philander (disambiguation)
