= Azariah Pierson =

"American Indian agent, draftsman, and Freemason"

Azariah Theodore Crane Pierson
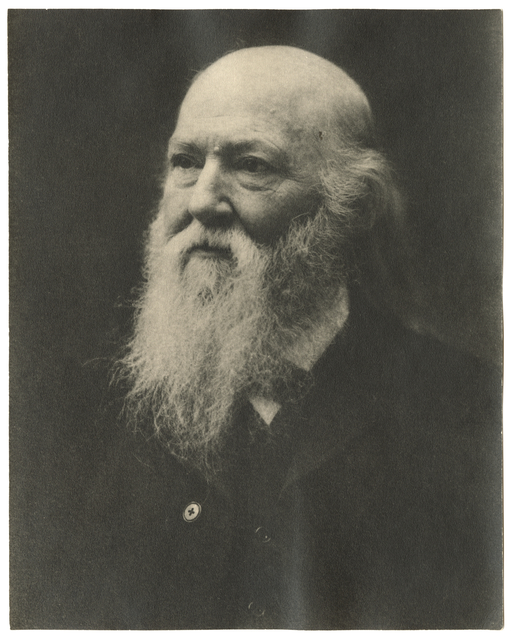
- Pierson c.1885-1889
- Born: August 29, 1817; Morris Plains, New Jersey, U.S.
- Died: November 26, 1890 (aged 73); Saint Paul, Minnesota
- Resting place: Oakland Cemetery, Saint Paul, Minnesota, U.S.
- Other name: A.T.C. Pierson
- Education: Barclay Street Medical College
- Occupations: Pharmacist; Indian agent Surveyor
- Known for: Establishing Freemasonry in the state of Minnesota
- Relatives: Edwin Aaron Clark Hatch (son-in-law)

Azariah Theodore Crane Pierson (August 29, 1817 - November 26, 1890) also written as A.T.C. Pierson, was an Indian agent, pharmacist, draftsman, and notable Freemason who settled the state of Minnesota. During his career as an Indian agent Pierson worked for the Northern Superintendency of Indian Affairs from roughly 1851 to 1862 and is noted for his role in the "Chippewa Disturbances" which occurred in 1857 and 1861. Due to his foundational role in Freemasonry in Minnesota, Pierson is often acclaimed as the "Father of Minnesota Freemasonry" during the Golden Age of Fraternalism.

== Early life ==
Azariah Theodore Crane Pierson was born on August 29, 1817, in Speedwell, near Morris Plains, New Jersey, to parents Joseph B. Pierson and Keturah Crane. Pierson's family moved to Ohio in 1819 before moving to New York in 1827, Pierson graduated from the Barclay Street Medical College (now the New York Academy of Sciences) that same year, although he did not practice medicine. In 1851, Pierson moved to the Minnesota Territory and settled in Saint Paul, Minnesota where he worked as a clerk for the Northern Superintendency of Indian Affairs which oversaw the development of the Indian reservation system for the Ho-Chunk, the Dakota, and the Ojibwe primarily in Minnesota and Wisconsin.

== Indian agent ==
During his tenure with the Northern Superintendency, Pierson was the superintendent of schools for the reservations in Minnesota. While working for the Northern Superintendency Pierson discovered that many of his peers, including Thomas J. Galbraith, were embezzling funds sent to the territorial government which were intended to be given to Native Americans as annuity payments for the land they had lost due to multiple treaties.

It was through Pierson's research into the roughly $5,000 in embezzled funds that the Northern Superintendency eventually fired and dismissed several employees. Thomas Galbraith stated the following in an 1862 letter to Clark W. Thompson about Pierson:

"Can a purchase be rigged, or had I better set my house in order & resign. My resignation will save you I hope. His (Pierson's) absences will save both, till I am prepared to vacate, which I would at any time on your suggestion & without Blackmailing or throwing you - you and Wilkinson".

Shortly after what became known as the "Chippewa Disturbances" Pierson resigned from his position with the Northern Superintendency by the end of 1862.

== Surveying career ==
Following the Dakota War of 1862 Pierson worked as the chief draftsman for the Surveyor General office in Saint Paul.

== Freemasonry ==
Pierson first became involved in Freemasonry while still living in New York in 1851, that same year he moved to Minnesota Territory. Pierson later became a member of the Scottish Rite, York Rite, and Royal Arch two years later in 1853. Pierson helped organize the first "Blue Lodge" of Freemasons in Minnesota in Saint Paul (later named St. Paul Lodge No. 3). Pierson was one of the founders of the early Grand Lodge of Minnesota and according to historian Ray Hayward is affectionately known as the "Father of Minnesota Freemasonry". Pierson was the Grand Master of the Grand Lodge of Minnesota from 1856 to 1863, and the lodge's Grand Secretary in 1864 and from 1876 to 1889. In his later years Pierson wrote an extended history of the traditions and Masonic rites of Freemasons in his 1870 book Traditions of Freemasonry and its Coincidences With the Ancient Mysteries and his 1882 book The Traditions, Origin and Early History of Freemasonry. Pierson had the following to say about Freemasonry and its goals as an organization:

"Masonry is a progressive science; all its mysterious light, all its sublime truths are not at once developed; it is only by gradual steps that its beauties are unfolded to the wondering mind of the aspirant".

=== Arguments with Albert Pike ===
Pierson had a unique relationship with Albert Pike, who Pierson had originally met in Saint Paul in 1852 during his first few months in the state. Early on, Pierson and Pike were cordial with one another and held one another in high regard, however, following the American Civil War Pierson began to infringe on some of Pike's duties as the Grand Commander of the Southern Supreme Council of the Scottish Rite. According to Pike, Pierson was infringing on the territory of Wisconsin (at the time part of the Supreme Council, Scottish Rite, Northern Jurisdiction) despite Minnesota being part of the Southern Jurisdiction. According to Pike, Pierson was also conferring degrees to Freemasons and chartering Masonic lodges within Minnesota without Pike's or the Southern Jurisdiction's dispensation and permission. Due to these various issues Pike had Pierson resign from his position as Sovereign Grand Inspector General and was removed from the roster of the 33rd Degree. Pierson also had differences with Pike on the subject of Prince Hall Freemasonry. While Pike argued that Prince Hall Masons were clandestine, Pierson argued that Price Hall Masons were unique in their own right and permissible as they were now free men.

Despite his resignation under Pike and the stripping of his 33rd Degree, Pierson remained a dedicated Mason within the state of Minnesota and continued to be active within the broader Masonic and Scottish Rite circles. In total, Pierson was a member of the Grand Lodge of Minnesota, the Scottish Rite, the York Rite, Royal Arch Masonry, the Knights Templar, and the Ancient Arabic Order Nobles of the Mystic Shrine (also known as Shriners).

== Personal life and death ==
Pierson married Eleanor Cooper Berrien (1819-1904) on October 19, 1835 in Chicago, together they had three daughters. Pierson's son-in-law via his daughter Charlotte C.B. Pierson was Edwin Aaron Clark Hatch, the commander of Hatch's Minnesota Cavalry Battalion. Pierson died on November 26, 1890 at the age of 73 from Bright's disease in Saint Paul. He is buried in Oakland Cemetery.

== Selected works ==
- Traditions of Freemasonry and its Coincidences With the Ancient Mysteries (1870).
- The Traditions, Origin and Early History of Freemasonry (1882).
