= Nathan Myrick =

American city founder

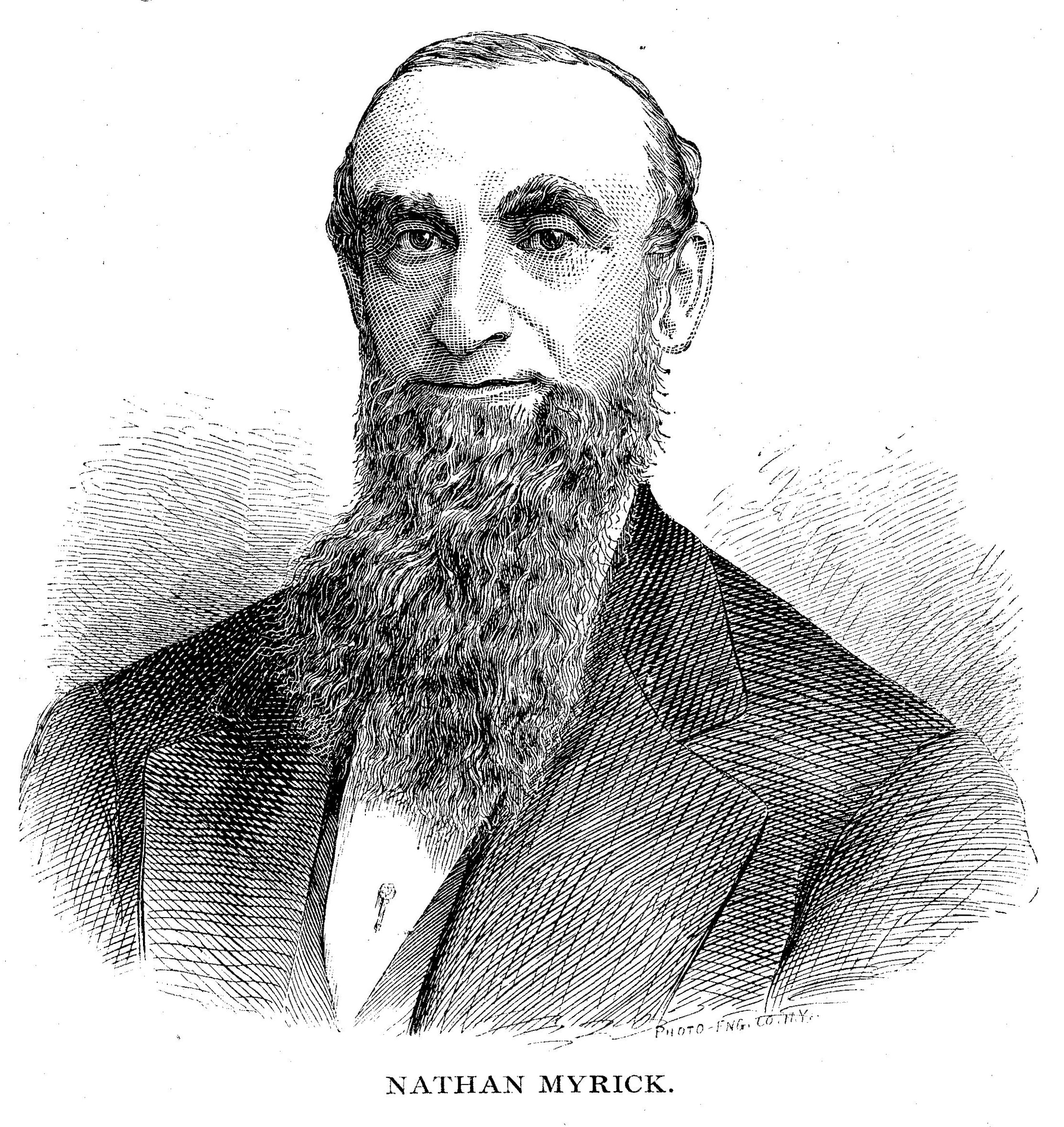
- Myrick c. 1875

Postmaster of La Crosse, Wisconsin
- In office 1844–1845
- Preceded by: Position established
- Succeeded by: Edwin Aaron Clark Hatch

Personal details
- Born: July 7, 1822 Westport, New York, U.S.
- Died: June 3, 1903 (aged 80) Saint Paul, Minnesota, U.S.
- Resting place: Oakland Cemetery; Saint Paul, Minnesota, U.S.
- Relations: Andrew Myrick (brother)
- Occupation: Fur trader, merhcant

Nathan Myrick (July 7, 1822 – June 4, 1903) was an American fur trader who founded the city of La Crosse, Wisconsin in 1841. Myrick originally engaged in the North American fur trade in Prairie du Chien, Wisconsin before traveling north to establish a fur trading post in what is now La Crosse. In 1848, he moved to Minnesota Territory to establish more fur trading posts. Myrick was the elder brother of Andrew Myrick who is known for instigating the Dakota War of 1862.

== Early life and education ==
Nathan Myrick was born on July 7, 1822, in Westport, New York.^{:66} Myrick was the son of Barnabas Myrick and Lovnia Bigelow.^{:542} Myrick's father, Barnabas, was a merchant in Westport.^{:66} Myrick received his education in Westport before working for his father in a tannery.^{:543} Myrick was a longtime friend of Edwin Aaron Clark Hatch, whose father owned a rival business in Westport.^{:543} Both Myrick and Hatch became infatuated with the American west and eventually decided to move to the western territories.^{:543}

Myrick moved to Wisconsin Territory at the age of nineteen on June 5, 1841, first settling in Prairie du Chien, Wisconsin.^{:544} Myrick originally intended to work for Hercules L. Dousman of the American Fur Company, however, Dousman refused Myrick due to his lack of knowledge of any regional Indigenous language and lack of experience in the "Indian trade".^{:544} Myrick eventually found work as an apprentice clerk for Bernard Walter Brisbois until November 1841.^{:67}^{:339}

== Career ==
Myrick settled what is now La Crosse, Wisconsin on November 9, 1841.^{:339} Myrick built a log cabin and trading post in La Crosse in order to establish a business and trading relationship with the local Ho-Chunk people.^{:340} Myrick was later joined by settler Harmon J. B. Miller in 1842 who became his business partner.^{:342} Hatch eventually made his way to La Crosse and was employed by Myrick and Miller as a clerk before owning his own trading post in Fountain City, Wisconsin.^{:347}

Myrick established a post office in La Crosse in 1844 and served as the city's first postmaster.^{:330} Myrick eventually started networking in the fur trade as far west as Saint Paul in Minnesota Territory. In 1848 Myrick left Wisconsin and settled in Minnesota Territory where he established trading posts in Watab, Long Prairie, Traverse des Sioux, Le Sueur, and Pembina.^{:69-70}

Myrick's younger brother, Andrew Myrick, owned several trading posts in Minnesota, including the main trading post located at the Lower Sioux Agency. Andrew was later killed during the attack at the Lower Sioux Agency during the opening stages of the Dakota War of 1862. Myrick discovered Andrew's body and brought back to Saint Paul for burial at Oakland Cemetery.

According to Minnesota historian Curtis E. Dahlin, many of Myrick's stores and trading posts were burned or ruined during the Dakota War of 1862. The Minnesota government reimbursing Myrick for $100,000 for his losses (nearly $3 million) following the conflict.

== Later life and death ==
Myrick retired from his businesses in 1876 and resided in Saint Paul until his death in 1903.

Myrick died on June 3, 1903, in Saint Paul, he is buried in Oakland Cemetery.

== Personal life ==
Myrick was married in 1843 to Rebecca E. Ismon in Charlotte, Vermont.^{:66}

== Legacy ==
Myrick Park in La Crosse was named in honor of Myrick. A commemorative plaque marking the site Myrick's original cabin was donated by the La Crosse chapter of the Daughters of the American Revolution in 1916.

== Sources ==
- "Nathan Myrick Founder of City Is Dead". La Crosse Chronicle. La Crosse, Wisconsin. June 4, 1903 – via the La Crosse Public Library Archives.
- "Nathan Myrick". Wisconsin Historical Dictionary. 3 August 2012.
