= James Lynd =

American politician

James William Lynd (November 25, 1830 – August 18, 1862) was a member of the Minnesota Senate, elected in 1861, and the first person killed in the initial action of the Dakota War of 1862. At the time, he was working in the Lower Sioux Agency as a clerk at Myrick's trading store. A historical marker stands at the site he was killed. The town of Lynd, Minnesota is named after him.
