= Harmon J. B. Miller =

American city founder

Harmon J.B. Miller
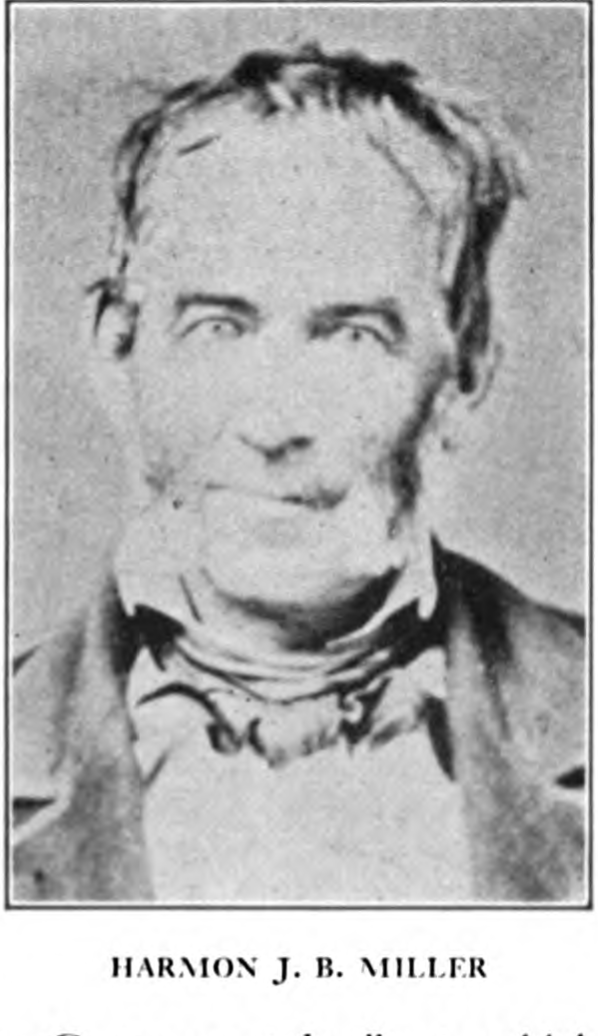
- Miller c.1860

Postmaster of La Crosse, Wisconsin
- In office 1848–1851
- Preceded by: Edwin Aaron Clark Hatch
- Succeeded by: Simon Kellogg

Personal details
- Born: February 10, 1806 Trenton, New York, U.S.
- Died: January 10, 1862 (aged 55) La Crosse, Wisconsin, U.S.
- Resting place: Oak Grove Cemetery; La Crosse, Wisconsin, U.S.
- Spouse: Marcia Louisa Pierson

Harmon J.B. Miller (February 10, 1806 - January 10, 1862), sometimes referred to as H.J.B. Miller or Scoots Miller, was an American fur trader, merchant, surveyor, and businessman who assisted Nathan Myrick in founding the city of La Crosse, Wisconsin. Miller was a business partner of Myrick and the manager of one of the first sawmills in Clark County, Wisconsin. Miller was later a key provider of lumber to Mormons from Nauvoo, Illinois in order to construct the Nauvoo Temple in the 1840s.

== Early life ==
Miller was born on February 10, 1806, in Trenton, New York. Miller grew up in Schaghticoke, New York before moving with his family to Batavia, Illinois. Miller later moved to Kane County, Illinois (later part of DeKalb County, Illinois) with his brother William in 1837. While in Kane County Miller was engaged in the construction roads such as the Haight Road in Geneva, Illinois.

== Life in Wisconsin ==
Miller first moved to Wisconsin Territory in 1842 to Prairie du Chien with his younger brother Horace Miller. In February 1842 Miller later moved to Clark County to Prairie la Crosse (now modern-day La Crosse, Wisconsin) along with traders Reed and Wells. Although immigration to Clark County was limited at the time, Miller was one of the first citizens alongside Myrick to settle in Clark County. Myrick and Miller assisted Ira Bronson in surveying what would be the city of La Crosse in 1842. The borders of the city would not be changed until later in 1851.

While in La Crosse Miller worked as a butcher and was a merchant and business partner of Nathan Myrick at a trading post named Myrick & Miller. While working with Myrick, Miller also frequently hauled trading provisions from Hercules L. Dousman in Prairie du Chien back to the trading post near the Black River where present-day Onalaska, Wisconsin is located.

In 1846 Miller speculated land near La Crosse alongside O.H. Dibble and built the first sawmill in Clark County on the Black River. Miller's log mill, along with others on the Black River, were later destroyed in 1847 during a river flood. During Miller's ownership of the lumber mill he assisted fellow lumber owner Jacob Spaulding in providing lumber to Illinois Mormons, including George Miller and Lyman Wight, for the construction of the original Nauvoo Temple in Nauvoo, Illinois. Spaulding was later one of the founding citizens of Black River Falls, Wisconsin. A number of Mormons temporarily settled in La Crosse in an area now known as the "Mormon coulee" and were employed by Myrick and Miller to harvest wood.

From 1848 to 1851 Miller served as La Crosse's postmaster following the resignation of his previous apprentice and clerk, Edwin Aaron Clark Hatch. Nathan Myrick served for a brief 1-year period from 1847 to 1848 in-between Hatch and Miller. Miller was later appointed as the justice of the peace of La Crosse.

== Personal life and death ==
Miller married Marcia Louisa Parry in 1844, together they had one child who survived infancy, Martha L.A. Miller. Marcia was the supposed first White person born in La Crosse. Miller died on January 10, 1862, in La Crosse, he is buried in Oak Grove Cemetery in La Crosse.
