= Hugh S. Donaldson =

Canadian-American settler (1832-1904)

Hugh Stephan Donaldson
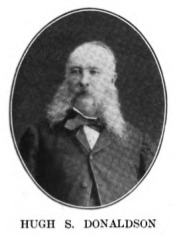
- Donaldson c.1890's

Member of the Minnesota Legislature
- In office 1862–1863

Member of the Dakota Territorial Legislature
- In office 1862–1863

Personal details
- Born: January 12, 1832 Montreal, Quebec
- Died: May 13, 1904 (aged 72) Whitby, Ontario
- Resting place: St. John's Anglican Church Cemetery; Whitby, Ontario
- Citizenship: Canada; United States
- Spouse: Margaret "Peggy" Harriott
- Children: 1
- Occupation: Politician fur trader soldier

Military service
- Allegiance: United States of America
- Branch/service: Union Army
- Years of service: 1863-1866
- Rank: Captain
- Unit: Hatch's Minnesota Cavalry Battalion
- Commands: Company D, Hatch's Minnesota Cavalry Battalion
- Battles/wars: American Civil War: Sioux Wars

Hugh Stephan Donaldson (January 12, 1832 - May 13, 1904) was a Canadian-American settler, fur trader, businessman, politician, military officer, and postmaster from Montreal. During his lifetime Donaldson was closely associated with the politics and history of the states of Minnesota and North Dakota, as well as Fort Garry in the Red River Colony. Donaldson was later a founding citizen of the city of Winnipeg in Manitoba. Donaldson was an associate and business partner of Joe Rolette.

== Early life ==
Hugh Stephan Donaldson was born on January 12, 1832 in Montreal, Upper Canada to parents William Donaldson and Elizabeth Louise Stewart. Donaldson's father was Scottish, while his mother was French Canadian. Donaldson ventured to Minnesota Territory as a young man and was an early settler of the Red River Colony and often traded furs with the Métis. He became an established citizen in the village of Pembina (now part of the state of North Dakota).

== Politics ==
From 1862 to 1863 Donaldson was a member of the Minnesota Legislature representing the Red River Colony. Donaldson was also a representative in the North Dakota Legislative Assembly (then the Territorial Legislature) as a member of both the First and Second Dakota Territorial House of Representatives for Dakota Territory from March 17 to May 15, 1862 and again from December 1, 1862 to January 9, 1863. Dakota Territory was not a formally recognized state until 1889.

== Military service ==
In the aftermath of the Dakota War of 1862 Donaldson raised a militia company in the Red River Colony in order to protect citizens living in Pembina as well as nearby settlements such as St. Joseph. Donaldson later volunteered his militia to the service of United States Major Edwin Aaron Clark Hatch and joined the ranks of Hatch's Minnesota Cavalry Battalion as the Captain of Company D on November 19, 1863. Donaldson was dismissed from his command on November 19, 1864 and returned to Pembina.

== Later life ==
In 1864 Donaldson moved north to Fort Garry in the Red River Colony and established a dry goods store which traded with merchants, Indigenous people, and the Métis. Donaldson was involved to a limited degree in the Red River Rebellion as a negotiation party alongside ex-Governor of Minnesota William Rainey Marshall, Henry Martin Robinson, and Richard Burdick.

Donaldson would continue living in Canada and eventually was one of the founding citizens of Winnipeg when the city was formally platted in 1873. Donaldson continued to live in Winnipeg until 1903 when he moved to Whitby, Ontario. Donaldson died on May 13, 1904 in Whitby. He is buried at St. John's Anglican Church Cemetery in Whitby.

== Legacy ==
Donaldson, Minnesota in Kittson County, Minnesota is named in honor of Donaldson.
