= Charles W. Nash (politician) =

American politician (1830–1910)

Charles Whippo Nash
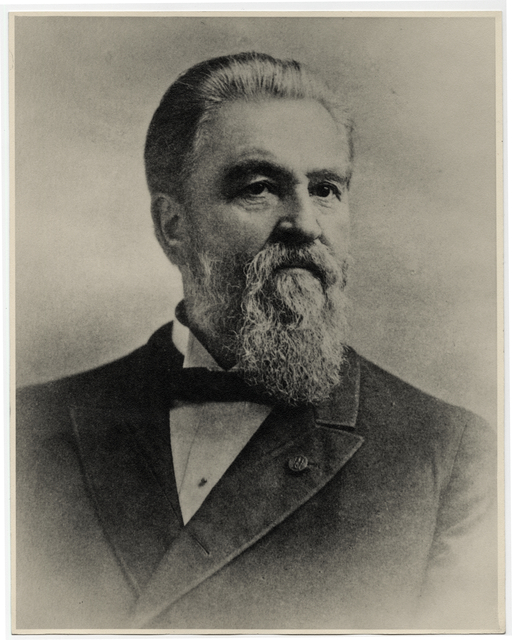
- Nash, C.1866-1872

Mayor of Des Moines
- In office 1857–1857
- Preceded by: William DeFord
- Succeeded by: William H. McHenry

Member of the Minnesota Legislature from the 7th district
- In office January 7, 1862 - January 4, 1864
- Preceded by: Archibald Hayes
- Succeeded by: Dudley F. Langley

Personal details
- Born: December 5, 1830 Albion, New York
- Died: August 18, 1910 (aged 79) Stanley County, South Dakota
- Resting place: Masonic Cemetery; Philip, South Dakota
- Other political affiliations: Minnesota Democratic Party
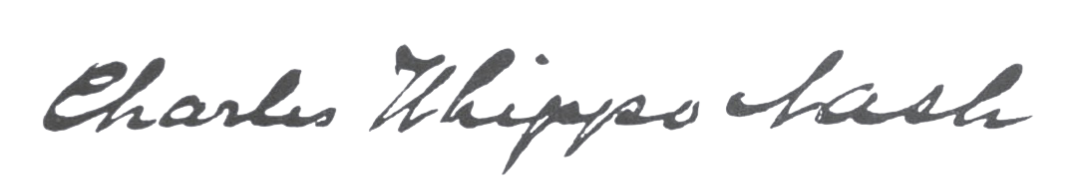
- Signature

Military service
- Allegiance: United States of America
- Years of service: 1863-1866
- Rank: Brevet Major
- Unit: Company C, Hatch's Minnesota Cavalry Battalion
- Battles/wars: American Civil War; Sioux Wars

Charles Whippo Nash (December 5, 1830 - August 18, 1910) was a politician, lawyer, freemason, military officer, and prominent citizen of Hastings, Minnesota. During his lifetime Nash served as the 6th Mayor of Des Moines, was member of the Minnesota Senate and Legislature, and served as the editor-in-chief of the St. Paul Pioneer Press newspaper.

== Early life ==
Charles Whippo Nash was born on December 15, 1830 in Albion, New York. He was the son of Ephraim Nash (1802–1864) and Lois Warner (1799–1870). Nash graduated from the Mayville Academy in Mayville, New York in 1850. Nash was educated in the field of law starting in 1851 at the State and National Law School in Poughkeepsie, New York. Nash was later married to Francis M. Barnum of Clinton, Michigan on July 6, 1854. Together the Nash's had two children: Clarence O. Nash and Charles Henry Rice Nash. While in Michigan, Nash was the superintendent of schools in both Adrian, Michigan and Tecumseh, Michigan.

== Iowa and Minnesota ==
Nash first moved to Iowa in 1855 where he practiced law. In 1857 Nash was elected to the office of Mayor of Des Moines. In December, 1857 Nash's library and law office was destroyed in a fire causing over $3,000 in damages. Nash did not hold the office of Mayor for very long, as he later moved to Minnesota in 1859 and settled in the city of Hastings, Minnesota in Dakota County. While in Hastings Nash set up a small law firm where he practiced. Nash later ran in the 1861 election for the Minnesota Legislature and from 1862-1864 represented Minnesota Senate, District 7 in both the 4th Minnesota Legislature and 5th Minnesota Legislature. Nash was a staunch supporter of the Democratic Party and actively partnered himself with the Minnesota Democratic Party.

== Freemasonry ==
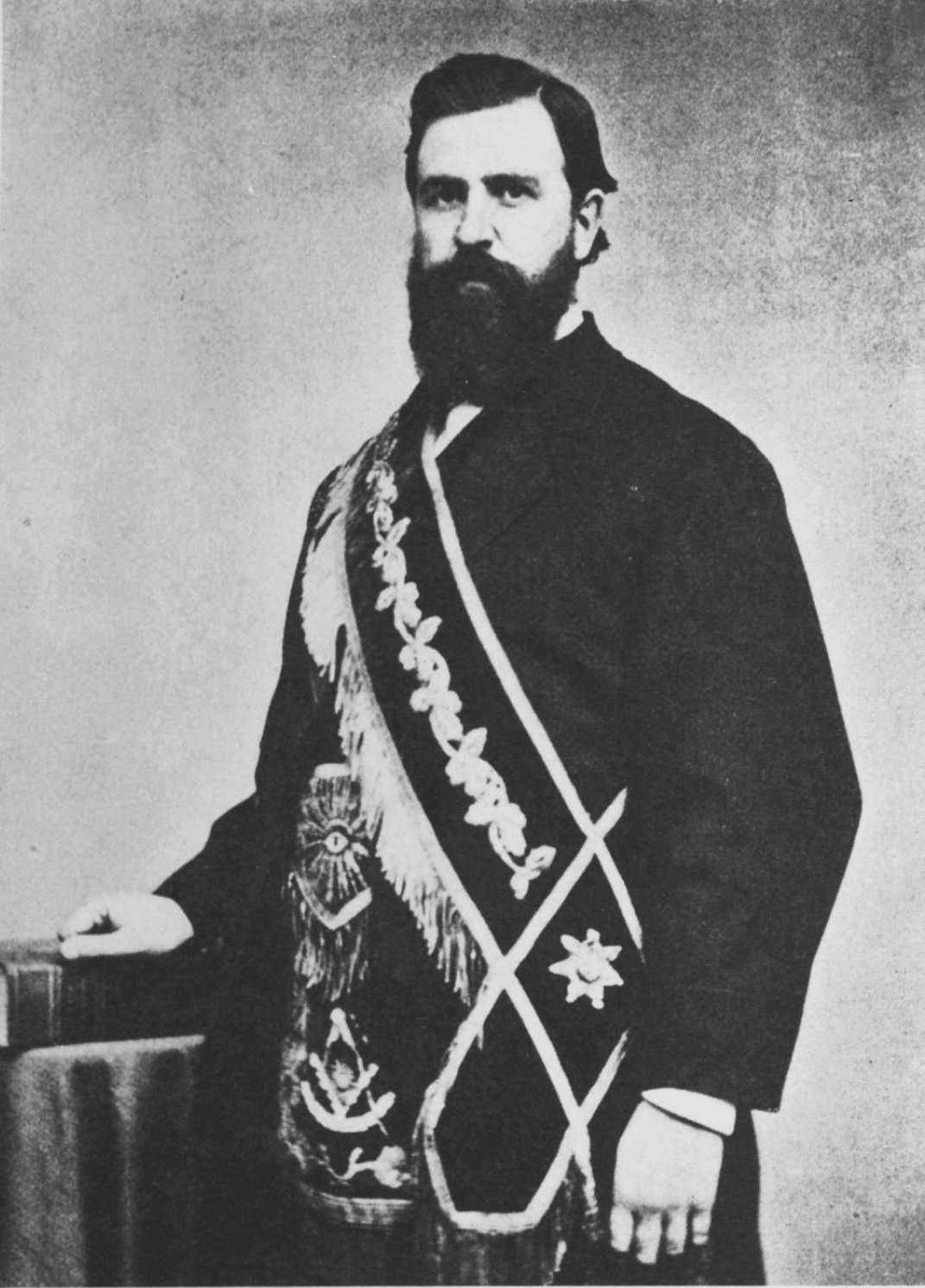
Nash in Masonic regalia

Nash was an avowed Freemason and was involved heavily with Cryptic Masonry, the York Rite, the Scottish Rite, and the Knights Templar. He held several high-ranking positions within Masonic hierarchy including: Worshipful Master, Grand High Priest, Grand Master, and was a 32° Thrice Puissant Grand Master. Nash was originally made a Mason in Tecumseh, Michigan in December, 1854. Nash received the Capitular degrees of Royal Arch Masonry in 1857, later being "anointed" as the High Priest in St. Paul, Minnesota in 1860. He later received the degrees of Cryptic Masonry in 1862 in St. Paul, and eventually received the Order of Knighthood and the Knights Templar in Des Moines. Nash was eventually elected as the Grand Master of the Grand Lodge of Minnesota from 1867-1871.

== Military career ==
In 1863 Nash volunteered for military service with Hatch's Minnesota Cavalry Battalion, a Minnesota cavalry battalion led by fellow freemason, Indian agent, and fur trader Edwin Aaron Clark Hatch. Nash was enrolled into the ranks of Company A of Hatch's Battalion under the command of Captain Abel Grovenor and was Grovenor's First lieutenant from 1863-1865. When Grovenor resigned his command of Company C, Nash was promoted to the rank of Captain on June 22, 1866. Nash was mustered out of service with the rest of the battalion in June, 1866 and received the brevet rank of Major.

== Later life and death ==
Following his military service Nash purchased the Pioneer Press, also called the St. Paul Pioneer Press. In 1865 Nash ran for the office of Lieutenant Governor of Minnesota. In January, 1869 Nash was elected as the Democratic minority leader during the Minnesota Democratic Legislative Caucus, he lost to majority leader Alexander Ramsey. Nash served as the Vice President of the reunion group of Hatch's Battalion in 1902. In 1906 Nash settled land in Stanley County, South Dakota under the Homestead Act. Nash died on Thursday August 18, 1910 at 6:15am near Marietta, Minnesota and is buried in the Odd Fellows' Cemetery (now the Masonic Cemetery) in Philip, South Dakota.
