= Donaldson, Minnesota =

City in Minnesota, United States

- City
- Location of Donaldson, Minnesota
- Coordinates: 48°34′21″N 96°53′44″W
- Country: United States
- State: Minnesota
- County: Kittson
- Incorporated: November 21, 1902

Government
  - Mayor: Lonnie G. Thompson

Area
  - Total: 0.227 sq mi (0.589 km^{2})
  - Land: 0.227 sq mi (0.589 km^{2})
  - Water: 0 sq mi (0.000 km^{2})
- Elevation: 820 ft (250 m)

Population (2020)
  - Total: 20
  - Estimate (2023): 20
  - Density: 88.0/sq mi (33.96/km^{2})
- Time zone: UTC−6 (Central (CST))
  - Summer (DST): UTC−5 (CDT)
- ZIP Code: 56720
- Area code: 218
- FIPS code: 27-16030
- GNIS feature ID: 0642883
- Sales tax: 6.875%

Donaldson is a city in Kittson County, Minnesota, United States. The population was 20 at the 2020 census.

U.S. Route 75 and Minnesota State Highway 11 are two of the main arterial routes in the community.

== History ==
A post office called Donaldson has been in operation since 1884. The city was named for Captain Hugh Donaldson, a local farmer.

== Geography ==
According to the United States Census Bureau, the city has a total area of 0.589 square miles (1.53 km^{2}), all land.

== Demographics ==
Historical population
Census	Pop.	Note	%±
1910	132		—
1920	167		26.5%
1930	133		−20.4%
1940	120		−9.8%
1950	128		6.7%
1960	64		−50.0%
1970	69		7.8%
1980	84		21.7%
1990	57		−32.1%
2000	41		−28.1%
2010	42		2.4%
2020	20		−52.4%
2023 (est.)	20		0.0%
U.S. Decennial Census; 2020 Census

=== 2010 census ===
As of the 2010 census, there were 42 people, 17 households, and 12 families living in the city. The population density was 50.6 inhabitants per square mile (19.5/km^{2}). There were 21 housing units at an average density of 25.3 per square mile (9.8/km^{2}). The racial makeup of the city was 100.0% White.

There were 17 households, of which 29.4% had children under the age of 18 living with them, 52.9% were married couples living together, 11.8% had a female householder with no husband present, 5.9% had a male householder with no wife present, and 29.4% were non-families. 29.4% of all households were made up of individuals. The average household size was 2.47 and the average family size was 3.08.

The median age in the city was 39 years. 28.6% of residents were under the age of 18; 2.3% were between the ages of 18 and 24; 26.2% were from 25 to 44; 21.5% were from 45 to 64; and 21.4% were 65 years of age or older. The gender makeup of the city was 54.8% male and 45.2% female.

=== 2000 census ===
As of the 2000 census, there were 41 people, 18 households, and 10 families living in the city. The population density was 49.6 inhabitants per square mile (19.2/km^{2}). There were 22 housing units at an average density of 26.6 per square mile (10.3/km^{2}). The racial makeup of the city was 97.56% White, and 2.44% from two or more races. Hispanic or Latino of any race were 2.44% of the population.

There were 18 households, out of which 27.8% had children under the age of 18 living with them, 38.9% were married couples living together, 11.1% had a female householder with no husband present, and 38.9% were non-families. 38.9% of all households were made up of individuals, and 11.1% had someone living alone who was 65 years of age or older. The average household size was 2.28 and the average family size was 3.00.

In the city, the population was spread out, with 26.8% under the age of 18, 4.9% from 18 to 24, 34.1% from 25 to 44, 29.3% from 45 to 64, and 4.9% who were 65 years of age or older. The median age was 39 years. For every 100 females, there were 141.2 males. For every 100 females age 18 and over, there were 172.7 males.

The median income for a household in the city was $26,875, and the median income for a family was $34,375. Males had a median income of $31,250 versus $16,250 for females. The per capita income for the city was $11,637. There are 18.2% of families living below the poverty line and 7.7% of the population, including no under eighteens and none of those over 64.
