= Philander =

Philander may refer to:

- Philander (name), includes a list of people with that name
- Philander (mythology), son of Apollo
- Philander (mammal), a genus of opossums
- "Philander", a historic name for the dusky pademelon (Thylogale brunii)

== See also ==
- Philando, given name
- Promiscuity
