= Shakopee III =

Mdewakanton Dakota chief

Chief Shakopee III
- Ṡaḳpedaƞ
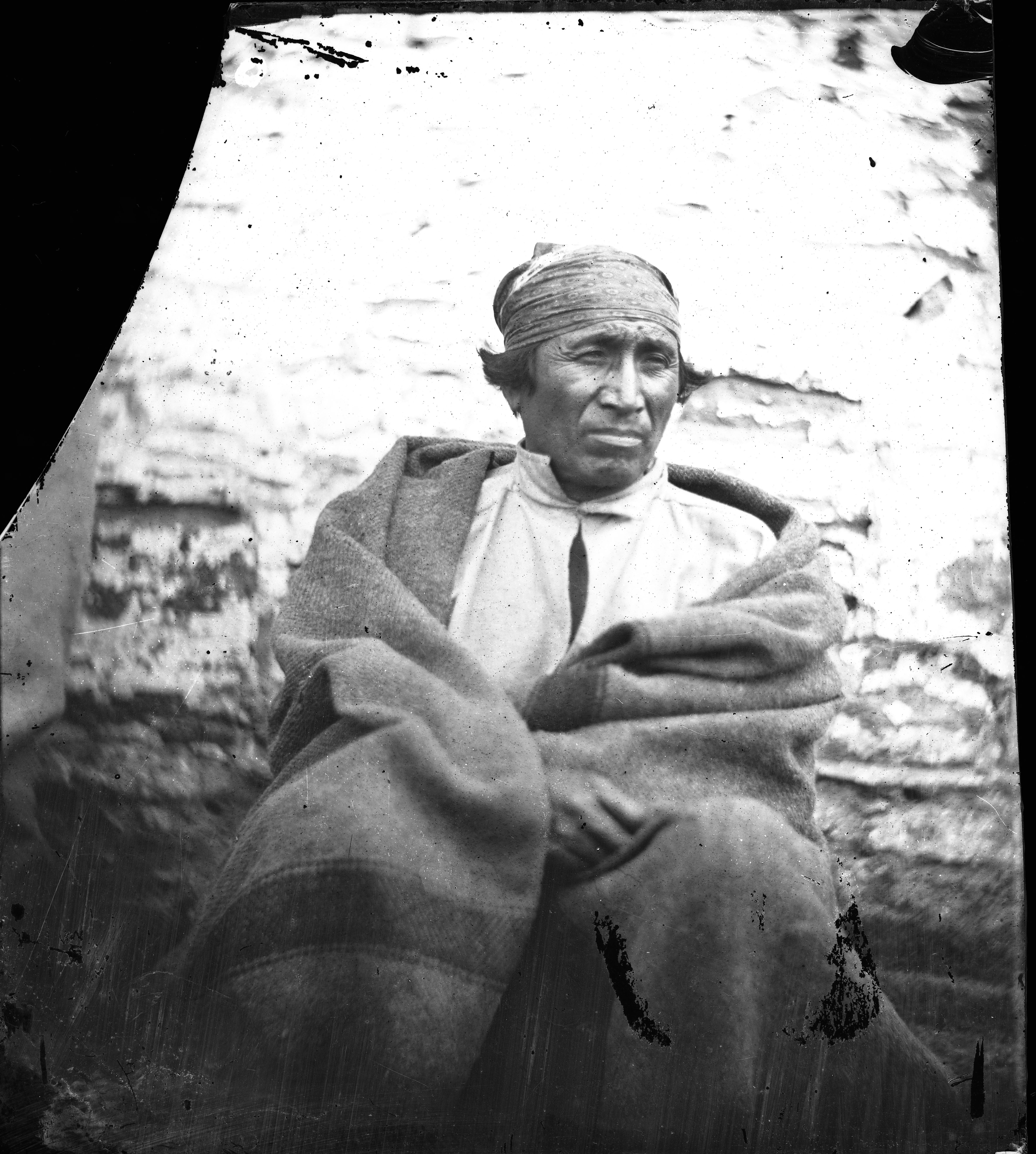
- Shakopee while imprisoned at Fort Snelling c. 1865 by Joel Emmons Whitney
- Born: c. 1811; Near modern-day Shakopee, Michigan Territory, U.S.
- Died: November 11, 1865; Fort Snelling; Saint Paul, Minnesota, U.S.
- Cause of death: Executed by hanging
- Known for: Subchief of the Mdewakanton; Participant in the Dakota War of 1862
- Father: Shakopee II
- Relatives: Shakopee I (grandfather)

Shakopee III (c. 1811 – November 11, 1865) was a Mdewakanton Dakota chief who was involved at the start of the Dakota War of 1862. Born Eatoka, which means "Another Language," he became known as Ṡaḳpedaƞ or Little Six after the death of his father in 1860.

Following the Dakota uprising in Minnesota, Little Six fled to Rupert's Land in present-day Manitoba, Canada. In January 1864, chiefs Little Six and Medicine Bottle were drugged, captured and transported across the U.S.–Canadian border to Pembina. There, they were arrested by Major Edwin A. C. Hatch and taken back to Fort Snelling. Little Six faced trial by a military commission in December 1864 and was executed by hanging on November 11, 1865. The Little Six Casino operated by the Shakopee Mdewakanton Sioux Community in Shakopee, Minnesota is named after him.

== Struggle for influence ==
By the time Little Six became chief in 1860, almost all bands of Dakota who had ceded their lands to the U.S. in the Treaties of 1851 and 1858 had moved to reservations bordering the upper Minnesota River. Shakopee's band was located more than one mile west of the mouth of the Redwood River.

According to Reverend Samuel W. Pond, Chief Little Six struggled to gain influence over his band. Little Six was inexperienced compared to his more charismatic uncle, Red Middle Voice ("Hochokaduta"). According to Pond, Red Middle Voice had surrounded himself with strongmen while his brother was still alive, and exerted "chief control over the band after he was dead," even though he was not formally recognized as chief.

=== Formation of Rice Creek village ===
Red Middle Voice ("Hocokayaduta") gained support among disaffected members of Shakopee's band who were unhappy with living conditions on the reservation. He broke from his brother's band and led his supporters to the north side of Rice Creek, some distance above the mouth of the Redwood River, where they established their own village. Rice Creek village, as it became known, was technically on U.S. land, but its members let it be known that they were willing to defend the encampment at all costs.

The Rice Creek band was looked down upon by the other Lower Sioux Dakota as troublemakers and misfits. However, over time, they attracted others, including some Sissetons and Wahpetons, who wanted to break away from their bands. By early 1862, they had about fifty members, with fifteen tepees.

== Role in U.S.–Dakota War of 1862 ==
=== Support for an uprising ===
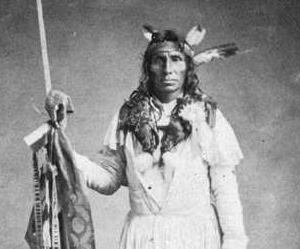
Chief Little Crow

On August 17, 1862, four young Mdewakanton hunters from Rice Creek village killed five Anglo-American settlers in present-day Acton, Minnesota. They returned to Rice Creek village that evening and told Cut Nose and Red Middle Voice, who were supportive of an uprising to drive settlers out of the region. Together with 100 warriors, Red Middle Voice went eight miles downstream to recruit his nephew, Little Six.

Little Six, in turn, resolved that an all-out war would only be possible with the backing of Chief Little Crow III. Although Little Crow initially scoffed at the idea, the group convinced him to lead them. Little Crow then ordered an attack on the Lower Sioux Agency the next morning, setting into motion the five-week Dakota War of 1862.

=== Attack at the Lower Sioux Agency ===
At daylight on August 18, 1862, warriors marched south toward the Lower Sioux Agency. The majority were from the bands of Red Middle Voice and Shakopee, but warriors from other Lower Sioux bands eventually joined them. Historian Gary Clayton Anderson writes that it is difficult to identify which warriors committed murders on the first day, but concludes that Cut Nose and Little Six were both involved, based on survivor narratives from Justina Boelter and Samuel Brown.

=== Capture of Brown family ===
In his narrative of the war, Sam Brown described the capture of his family by Little Six, Cut Nose, Dowanniye and others near their home, which was about eight miles east of the Upper Sioux Agency. On August 19, 1862, Sam Brown, his mother Susan Frenier Brown, his siblings, and other families were in wagons heading for Fort Ridgely, when they were stopped and surrounded on the road by a large Dakota war party.

According to Brown, the Dakota warriors were intent on killing them. His mother stood up in the wagon, waved her shawl, and shouted loudly in Dakota that "she was a Sisseton – a relative of Wanataan, Scarlet Plume, Sweetcorn, Ah-kee-pah [Akipa] and the friend of Standing Buffalo, that she had come down this way for protection and hoped to get it." Nevertheless, Cut Nose, Little Six and Dowanniye were among the first to run toward them, "shaking their bloody tomahawks menacingly in [their] faces."

They finally stopped when one of the warriors recognized Susan Brown and declared that her life, and the lives of her family members, should be spared. She had taken the man in during the previous winter when he was freezing, and he wished to repay her kindness. The warriors then turned their attention to five of the white men who were with them and insisted on killing only them. They explained that they had all taken a vow the day before, and that if they spared the men, Little Crow and the soldiers' lodge might order to have them killed.

After further negotiations – including Susan Brown's threat to bring down the wrath of the entire Sisseton and Wahpeton tribes if the other men were harmed – the warriors relented and let the five men go. The Brown family was then taken to Rice Creek village. During the journey, they encountered the corpses of three men and one woman, whom Cut Nose confirmed they had killed earlier.

Brown recalled that Little Six had taunted his brother-in-law and their wagon driver with a song about killing men who made him angry:

Shakopee or Little Six, who was also on horseback, would now and then galop [sic] ahead and then suddenly turn and with a whoop and a yell dash toward us and cock his gun and eye us fiercely. Mother did not like this. She told him that she wanted none of his foolishness around her, and that he must either shoot and kill or stop his antics. He would reply that we were his prisoners and should not talk so much, and then commenced singing the war song. He would shake his tomahawk at Blair and Lonsman and then repeat the war song that got so familiar afterwards...When he saw that mother was not afraid of him he quit his fooling.

=== Battle of Fort Ridgely ===
On the evening of August 19, Little Crow called a council in which he argued in favor of an all-out attack on Fort Ridgely, a move which Little Six supported. They viewed the capture of Fort Ridgely as the key to gaining control over the entire Minnesota River valley.

At noon on August 20, 350 to 450 Dakota men left the camp which had been set up near Little Crow's village, and headed toward Fort Ridgely. Little Six was reportedly among the chiefs who led their bands in the first Battle of Fort Ridgely, with the objective of overrunning the fort.

Little Crow himself was seen ordering his men on the west side of the fort, distracting the U.S. garrison while the other Dakota bands crept up the ravine to the east and took control of some of the outbuildings on the fort's northeast corner. In response, an artillerist from the 5th Minnesota Infantry Regiment and a refugee from the Lower Sioux Agency aimed two howitzers at the northeast corner and fired. Supported by musket fire, the artillery shells drove the Dakota away from the buildings and back into the ravine.

The Dakota fired from a distance for five more hours, and withdrew back to the Lower Sioux Agency in the evening. This was the first time that the Sioux had encountered artillery shells, and they were disturbed by the severe injury and deaths caused by the "rotten balls."

=== Rest of the war ===
The extent of Little Six's involvement in the rest of the war is unclear. On August 24, Little Crow led the Lower Sioux bands in a hasty retreat ten miles north to Rice Creek, to unite with Little Six, Red Middle Voice and their bands. On August 28, the unified camp broke up and formed a large caravan, crossing the Yellow Medicine River where they organized a new camp.

In a council held on August 31, Little Crow argued in favor of heading toward the "Big Woods" west of Hutchinson, Minnesota. He faced opposition from other band chiefs, including Little Six, who advocated heading south instead to collect plunder they had left behind at Little Crow's village and at New Ulm, which had been abandoned.

In the end, they agreed to divide their forces. One party went west on raids in the Big Woods with Little Crow. The larger party led by Gray Bird and Mankato went south and ended up in the Battle of Birch Coulee. Little Six, however, is not reported to have gone with either.

Chief Big Eagle later stated in his narrative of the war that Little Six "took part in the outbreak, murdering women and children, but I never saw him in battle, and he was caught in Manitoba and hanged...My brother, Medicine Bottle, was hanged with him."

== Escape to Rupert's Land and capture ==
After the Dakota War of 1862, Shakopee, Medicine Bottle (Wakanozanzan), and their followers fled north across the international border to the Red River Colony (today a part of the Canadian province of Manitoba) in Rupert's Land, at the time still a part of British North America. Hundreds of their followers settled near Fort Garry (present day Winnipeg), at the mouth of Assiniboine River, beyond the jurisdiction of the U.S. military. Although their presence was not welcomed by British colonial authorities, little could be done against them legally, since they had committed no offenses in British North America.

=== Hatch's Battalion ===
Back in Minnesota, a new mounted battalion was raised under Major Edwin A.C. Hatch, a newly commissioned officer with no military experience. On General Henry Hastings Sibley's suggestion, the battalion was sent to the town of Pembina to guard against a possible incursion by the Dakota Sioux who had taken refuge in the Red River Colony. "Hatch's Battalion" reached Pembina on November 13, 1863, after marching 400 miles from Fort Snelling.

Hatch was particularly keen to capture Shakopee. Little Six was said to have boasted in Pembina that he had personally killed more than fifty men, women and children during the war in Minnesota.

On December 15, Hatch sent twenty troops to St. Joseph, an old British trading post forty miles west of Pembina where a group of Sioux were encamped. At 3:00 am, they surrounded the camp as the Dakota were sleeping, and shot them as they emerged from their tepees, killing six. The incident shocked and demoralized the Dakota. Soon afterwards, the governor of Rupert's Land sent a message to Hatch that many Dakota were willing to surrender if none were punished for the uprising in Minnesota.

Hatch responded by letter stating that he was willing to take them into custody and feed them, if they turned in their weapons and surrendered Little Six and seven or eight other suspected murderers. During the month of January 1864, a total of 91 Dakota surrendered in Pembina.

=== Capture of Little Six and Medicine Bottle ===
On Christmas Day, 1863, a lieutenant from Hatch's Battalion was sent across the border to Fort Garry to discuss the capture of Little Six and Medicine Bottle. He met with John H. McKenzie to inform him that there would be a substantial financial reward if he succeeded. Sometime later, a captain from the battalion informed McKenzie that Andrew G. B. Bannatyne, who supplied the battalion with horse feed, would be willing to assist by providing teams to transport the entire band across the border to Pembina.

On January 15, 1864, John H. McKenzie and his colleague Onisime Giguere traveled 25 miles up the Assiniboine River to the Sioux encampment. The next day, they met with the chiefs and misinformed them that the British colonial authorities would stop providing them with rations. Little Six became upset, and said he would need to speak to the governor of Rupert's Land and the bishop at once.

McKenzie and Giguiere offered Little Six and Medicine Bottle a ride to Fort Garry if they left right away. Around midnight, they had supper and a jug of toddy at McKenzie's house. The following day was Sunday, and the chiefs were asked to respect the Sabbath by staying home. McKenzie provided them with more toddy combined with laudanum which had been provided by Bannatyne. They then went to Bannatyne's house, where they were given a glass of wine laced with laudanum. That afternoon, they "went into the spree in good earnest, on raw whiskey made of alcohol." McKenzie pretended to be worried about giving them too much to drink, while refilling Giguiere's glass mostly with water.

Little Six became unconscious at around 9 pm. To prevent him from waking up, Bannatyne put a handkerchief soaked in chloroform to his nose. They tied his hands and feet, and strapped Little Six to a "flat dog sled" lined with buffalo robes. McKenzie then set off for Pembina with Little Six in tow. Medicine Bottle, who was only in his mid-thirties, was less intoxicated. They struggled for a while to bind and strap him onto another sled. Giguere then set off for Pembina with Medicine Bottle in tow. Bannatyne had provided the men with a relief of horses.

At noon the next day, they arrived in Pembina and delivered Little Six and Medicine Bottle to Major Hatch, who promptly arrested them. Hatch's battalion took Little Six and Medicine Bottle first to Fort Abercrombie, then finally to Fort Snelling, where they arrived on May 27, 1864.

== Trial ==
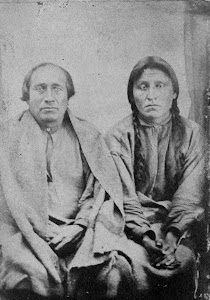
Little Six and Medicine Bottle at Fort Snelling, 1864

On November 18, 1864, General Henry Hastings Sibley issued an order for a military commission to conduct the trials of Little Six and Medicine Bottle at Fort Snelling. The trials had been delayed because most of Sibley's commissioned officers had either been assigned to frontier military posts, or were detached for General Alfred Sully's expedition. The panel of officers he finally selected for the military commission all came from a single regiment, the 2nd Minnesota Cavalry Regiment, before it had completed a year of service.

Little Six's trial started on December 2, immediately after the trial of Medicine Bottle had concluded. He asked for time to introduce counsel. The commission granted a one-day adjournment. When the trial resumed, Little Six stated that former Territorial Governor Willis A. Gorman had agreed to defend him, but was unavailable until December 9. He requested a further six-day adjournment, which the commission denied.

Little Six was then tried on two charges: murder and "general participation in the murders[,] massacres and other outrages." The specifications to the first charge alleged that Little Six had killed various unidentified men, women and children in Brown, Renville, and other counties on or about August 18 and 19, 1862. The specifications to the second charge alleged that Little Six actively participated in murders, massacres and other outrages, and that he fought in battles in which many soldiers were killed.

The commission called forward six witnesses, all Dakota who had not been involved in any murders or combat. None had directly witnessed Little Six killing anyone. Three of them testified that they had heard Little Six boast of having killed settlers on the evening of the first day of the outbreak – one said he had killed seven, another said it was thirteen, and the third witness said he had said he killed six. Taopi stated that eight days after the initial outbreak, Little Six had boasted of killing a German settler and his women and children.

Little Six did not produce any witnesses, but asked to submit a written statement. In History of Minnesota, William Folwell wrote:

The statement was brief. His father had been a good chief and always friendly to the whites. Little Six had tried to be like him and was friendly to the whites, but his people had made war on them without his knowledge and threatened to kill him if he opposed them. He recalled telling Little Crow that whites were killed, but he was never in any fight because he knew it was not right. While his people were fighting at Wood Lake he was moving up to the British territory. He would have remained there forever but was taken away. He never intended to see another American because he was ashamed for what his people had done.

On December 7, the commission issued its verdict. Little Six was found guilty on both charges – murder and general participation in murders – but not guilty of shooting at and killing soldiers. Little Six was sentenced to death, to be hanged at a time to be determined by the commanding brigadier general. The commission also reasoned that Little Six and Medicine Bottle did not need to be returned to British soil, because the actions of Hatch and his men in instigating their capture had not been authorized by General John Pope.

== Execution ==
On December 14, 1864, General Henry Hastings Sibley confirmed the executions of both Little Six and Medicine Bottle. He set the date for execution on January 20, 1865. Sibley forwarded the findings of the commission to Judge Advocate General Joseph Holt, and stated that the two were "chiefs of two of the bands most deeply implicated" in the Dakota War of 1862. He also asserted that they both led "not only in instigating their people to attack the whites, but in personal participation in the indiscriminate butchery of men, women and children." Regarding the legality of their arrest, he argued that the two men had been captured by British subjects, not American soldiers or citizens.

On January 20, 1865, General John Pope confirmed the judgments. In March, General Holt reviewed the transcript of the proceedings and strongly recommended to President Abraham Lincoln that he approve both executions. On August 29, 1865, Andrew Johnson, who became U.S. President after Lincoln's assassination, approved the death sentences.

When Little Six and Medicine Bottle were informed of Johnson's decision, Little Six said:

"I am not a squaw – I can die whenever the white man wishes."

The date of their execution was then set for October 11. Father Augustin Ravoux, who served as spiritual adviser to Little Six and Medicine Bottle, lobbied for the commutation of their sentences. On October 2, the Right Reverend Thomas Grace, the Roman Catholic bishop of Saint Paul, Minnesota, wrote to President Andrew Johnson opposing the execution of Little Six and Medicine Bottle, "in consideration of the treacherous manner in which they were brought within the jurisdiction" of the United States. Bishop Grace wrote:

However guilty they may be, it is the instinct of every generous mind that the Government cannot execute punishment upon them under the circumstances, without dishonor to itself.

President Johnson sent Bishop Grace's letter to Secretary of the Interior James Harlan. On October 10, Harlan sent the letter back to the president and recommended suspending the sentences, on the basis that he had been unable to get information about the case from the Department of War. The president immediately suspended the sentence.

Minnesota Governor Stephen Miller then wrote to President Johnson appealing on behalf of the victims of the 1862 conflict that they consider the cases carefully. He also wrote to Secretary Harlan that sufficient evidence had been presented for execution. The judge advocate general then reviewed the cases again and issued a final opinion and recommendation to the president recommending execution.

The execution was set for Saturday, November 11 at 12 noon. Colonel Robert N. McLaren, the commandant at Fort Snelling, informed Little Six and Medicine Bottle through Father Ravoux. The two men calmly nodded and smiled.

=== Day of execution ===
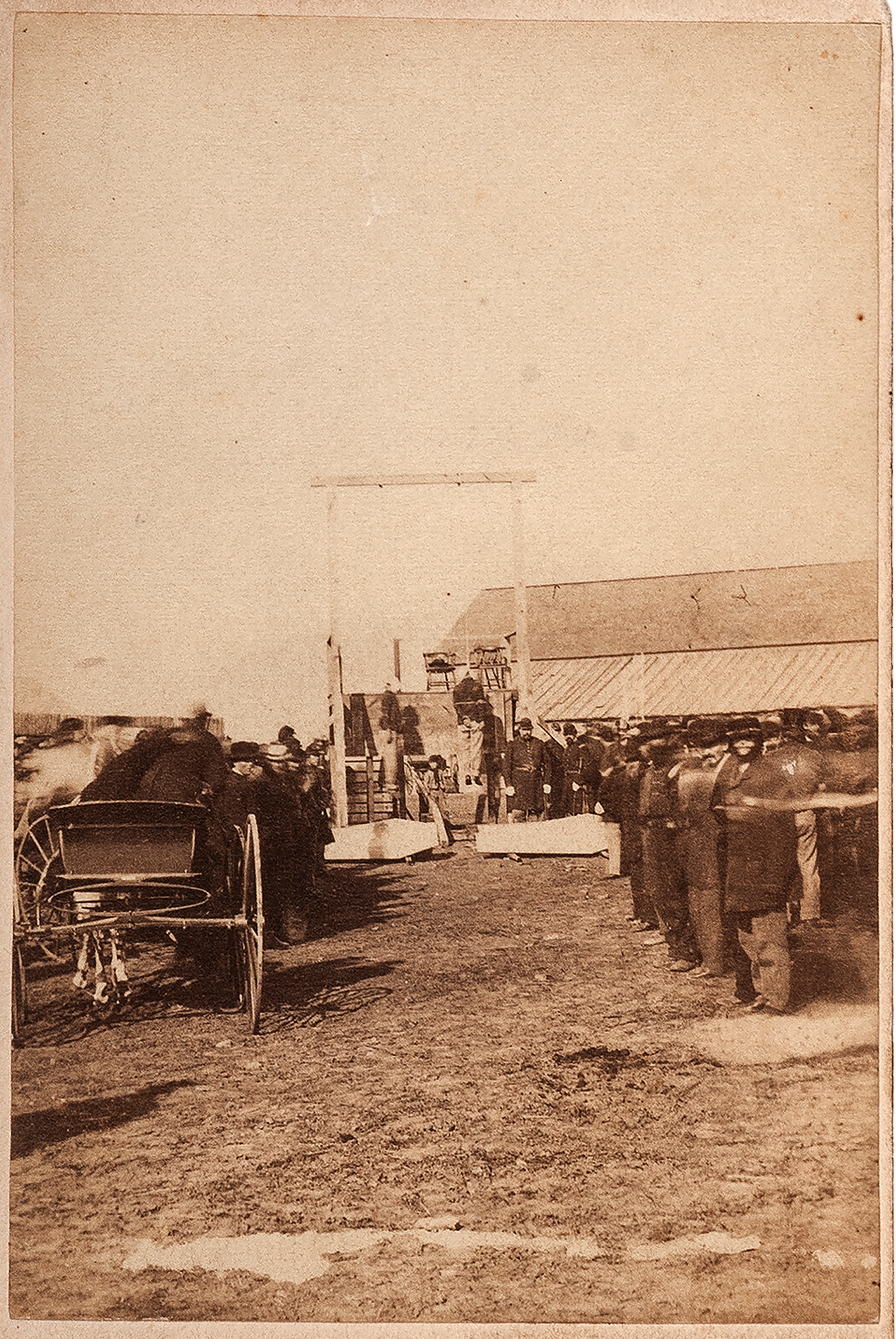
Hanging of Little Six and Medicine Bottle, 1865

On November 11, Little Six and Medicine Bottle were executed by hanging at Fort Snelling. Father Ravoux went early to be with Little Six and Medicine Bottle until the end. Medicine Bottle said prayers he had learned from the priest while Little Six grunted in agreement. Little Six gave his pipe to Colonel McLaren and a letter and small valise for his wife.

More than 400 citizens of Saint Paul assembled to watch the execution. At 12 noon, 425 soldiers marched in formation around the double gallows.

==== Last words ====
A popular legend is that Little Six heard the whistle of a steam locomotive in the distance as he climbed the steps of the gallows. Pointing in the direction of the train, Little Six supposedly said, "As the white man comes in, the Indian goes out." Historian Micheal Clodfelter writes, "Though the cinematic speech never occurred, this final hanging did mark a melodramatic end to Santee Minnesota."

=== Aftermath ===
After the hangings, some witnesses ran up to the gallows to cut off pieces of the nooses to keep as souvenirs.

At some point after the execution, the bodies of Little Six and Medicine Bottle were acquired by doctors in Saint Paul, Minnesota. According to Dakota researcher and filmmaker Sheldon Wolfchild, Shakopee's body was preserved in a wooden whiskey barrel and sent to Jefferson Medical College in Philadelphia, where it was used by Professor Joseph Pancoast for his lessons in human anatomy.

In 1867, the Minnesota Legislature approved $1,000 to be paid for the services and expenses of John H. McKenzie and Onisime Giguere in the capture of Little Six and Medicine Bottle.
