= Andrew Myrick =

American trader (1832–1862)

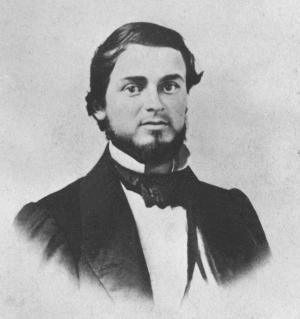
- Myrick c. 1860
- Born: Andrew Jackson Myrick; May 28, 1832; Westport, New York, U.S.
- Died: August 18, 1862 (aged 30); Lower Sioux Indian Reservation, Minnesota, U.S.
- Resting place: Oakland Cemetery; Saint Paul, Minnesota
- Occupations: Indian agent, merchant, and trader
- Known for: Instigating the Dakota War of 1862
- Relatives: Nathan Myrick (brother)

Andrew Jackson Myrick (May 28, 1832 – August 18, 1862) was an Indian agent, fur trader, and merchant who operated trading posts in southwest Minnesota at two Native American agencies serving the Dakota (referred to as Sioux at the time) near the Minnesota River.

In the summer of 1862, when the Dakota were starving because of failed crops and delayed annuity payments, Myrick is noted as refusing to sell them food on credit when they were starving and being described on that account as the "most hated of the traders". He was alleged to have said of the Dakota, "Let them eat grass." The validity of that quotation however is now disputed.

== Early life ==
Myrick was born on May 28, 1832 in Westport, New York, he was the son of Barnabas Myrick, a merchant and member of the New York General Assembly, and Lovina A. Bigelow, he was the younger brother of Nathan Myrick, the founder of La Crosse, Wisconsin. Myrick was named after Andrew Jackson, the seventh President of the United States.

== Career ==
Following his older brother Nathan, Myrick moved to Iowa Territory (now Minnesota) in the 1850s and began a career in trading with various Dakota, Ho-Chunk, and Ojibwe people beginning at Traverse des Sioux. While in Minnesota Myrick not only ran his brother's trading posts at the Upper Sioux Agency and Lower Sioux Agency, but also constructed several flatboat barges which transported goods along the Minnesota River to Fort Ridgely. During this time Myrick married a Dakota woman. At the time many voyageurs, fur traders, and merchants married Indigenous and Métis women as a customary practice of marriage à la façon du pays during the North American fur trade. Like other merchants on the two agencies, Myrick spent most of his time at the Lower Agency which was slightly closer to St. Paul.

== Role in the Dakota War ==
In the summer of 1862, eastern bands of the Dakota people were living in two small reservations along the southern bank of the Minnesota River, the Upper Sioux Indian Reservation and the Lower Sioux Indian Reservation. Their crops had failed and the area had been overhunted, and they were starving. In a meeting at the Upper Sioux Agency on August 4, US Indian Agent Thomas Galbraith directed that only some food be released to the Dakota from the warehouse, as annuity supplies and payments had been delayed by the American Civil War and a government preoccupied with the Northern Virginia Campaign, which threatened the safety of the capital, Washington D.C.

Andrew Myrick had stores at both Yellow Medicine (also known as the Upper Sioux Agency) and Redwood (Lower Sioux Agency). After Galbraith decided against issuing more of the annuity food, he turned to the store owners and workers and asked them what they were intending to do. Myrick tried to broker a deal with the bands of the Dakota in which the traders were to be paid directly with the federal annuity payments, once those delayed payments arrived, in exchange for the traders extending credit to the Dakota.

== Death ==
On August 18, 1862 Chief Little Crow led his warriors against U.S. settlements, beginning the Dakota War of 1862. Myrick was killed on the first day at the Attack at the Lower Sioux Agency, where Dakota warriors took revenge at the agency for its refusal to sell or give them food. Various accounts differ as to the manner of Myrick's death, one source states that Myrick's body "was mutilated, his head being severed from the body and the mouth filled with grass". A second source, a letter written by Edwin Aaron Clark Hatch to his wife states that Myrick's brother Nathan found his body with "an arrow in his arm and an old burned scythe thrust through him". Lastly, the article Sibley's Winnebago Prisoners by Linda Waggoner states that Myrick was shot and then stabbed by a Winnebago (Ho-Chunk) native named Little Priest. Myrick's remains are buried at Oakland Cemetery in Saint Paul, Minnesota.

== See also ==
- Nathan Myrick, Andrew Myrick's brother
