= Philander P. Humphrey =

American physician

Philander P. Humphrey (February 26, 1823 – August 18, 1862) was an American medical doctor and politician.

Born in Torrington, Connecticut, Humphrey was trained as a physician at Oberlin College. In 1852, Humphrey moved to Red Wing, Minnesota Territory. In 1857, Humphrey served in the Minnesota Territorial Council. On August 18, 1862, Humphrey, his wife, and two of their children were killed in the Battle of Lower Sioux Agency, where he was the physician for the Sioux Tribe.

As the attack began, Humphrey, his wife and their three children were among the civilians who had escaped towards Fort Ridgely 14 miles away. They were overtaken and killed while in flight. Only his twelve-year-old son, who had been sent to get water for his mother, survived and eventually reached the fort.
