= Edwin Aaron Clark Hatch =

American fur trader and military officer (1825–1882)

Major Edwin Aaron Clark Hatch
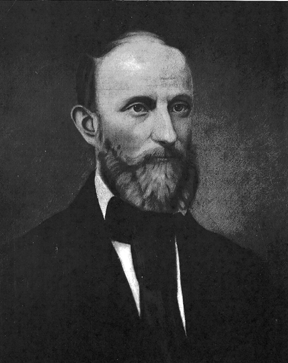
- Portrait of Hatch in 1875
- Born: March 23, 1825; Westport, New York, U.S.
- Died: August 13, 1882 (aged 57); Saint Paul, Minnesota, U.S.
- Burial place: Oakland Cemetery, Saint Paul, Minnesota
- Relatives: Azariah Pierson (father-in-law)
- Military career
- Allegiance: United States of America
- Branch: Union Army
- Service years: 1863–1864
- Rank: Major
- Unit: Hatch's Minnesota Cavalry Battalion
- Commands: Hatch's Minnesota Cavalry Battalion
- Known for: The capture of Shakopee III and Medicine Bottle
- Conflicts: American Civil War; Dakota War of 1862; Battle of Fort Ridgely; Sioux Wars

Edwin Aaron Clark Hatch or E.A.C. Hatch (March 23, 1825 - August 13, 1882) was a Minnesota and Wisconsin fur trader, an early citizen of La Crosse, Wisconsin, the postmaster of La Crosse, an Indian agent, a military officer, and a railroad worker for the Great Northern Railway.

== Early life ==
Hatch was born in Westport, New York on March 23, 1825, he was the son of Charles Beardsley Hatch and Margaretta Ann Hatch (née Winans). The Hatch family were close friends and business partners with Barnabas Myrick and the Myrick family, also of Westport. Barnabas' sons Nathan Myrick and Andrew Myrick would both become notable traders in the states of Minnesota and Wisconsin.

== Fur trading in Wisconsin ==
Hatch left New York in the summer of 1843 planning to engage in the North American fur trade and ended up settling in Prairie du Chien, Wisconsin before relocating to La Crosse, Wisconsin. While in La Crosse Hatch worked as a clerk and merchant for Nathan Myrick and Harmon J. B. "Scoots" Miller. Hatch was posted at Holmes Landing near Fountain City, Wisconsin in 1844 at a small trading post which traded heavily with the Ho-Chunk and Dakota people. Hatch eventually became the postmaster for La Crosse in 1845 and held the position for one year before resigning from the position in favor of Harmon J.B. Miller.

== Indigenous removals ==
Hatch was significantly involved in a series of Indian removals in the states of Iowa, Minnesota, and Wisconsin in the spring and summer of 1848. These removals primarily affected the Ho-Chunk and Dakota people who were removed from Wisconsin and Iowa and relocated to both Long Prairie, Minnesota and Blue Earth County, Minnesota onto reservations.

== Indian agent for the Blackfoot Confederacy ==
In 1855 President of the United States Franklin Pierce requested Minnesota Congressman Henry M. Rice to appoint an Indian agent for the Blackfoot Confederacy in modern day Montana. Rice, a fellow fur trader and Indian agent chose Hatch to be the agent for the Blackfeet people and was posted at both Fort Union and later Fort Benton, Montana from 1855-1856. Hatch kept a diary from 1855-1856 which is held by the Newberry Library describing his time in Montana. While in Montana Hatch was responsible for overseeing government annuity payments to the Blackfeet Nation, specifically the Piegan Blackfeet, the Kainai Nation, and the Gros Ventre.

== Dakota War of 1862 ==
In 1862 Hatch was living in St. Paul, he was chosen by the Northern Superintendency of Indian Affairs along with several Indian agents to carry the $71,0000 worth of annuity payments via stagecoach to the Dakota at the Upper Sioux Agency and Lower Sioux Agency. The stagecoach stopped at Fort Ridgely while on the way to the reservation on August 20, 1862, later on the Battle of Fort Ridgely occurred which Hatch took part in. Hatch is listed as one of the armed citizen defenders on the Fort Defenders Monument or Fort Ridgely State Monument at Fort Ridgely in Fairfax, Minnesota. Hatch was later part of a burial party which buried some of the civilians who were killed during the attack at the Lower Sioux Agency, numbering among the dead at the reservation was Hatch's childhood friend Andrew Myrick. Shortly before the attacks at the reservation Myrick was asked if he could spare any food to the starving Dakota. Myrick is known infamously for stating "So far as I am concerned, if they are hungry let them eat grass or their own dung".

== Hatch's Battalion ==
Following the Dakota War of 1862 Hatch was appointed to the rank of Major on June 9, 1863 and was responsible for raising an independent battalion of United States Volunteer cavalry for the state of Minnesota, this unit was later named Hatch's Minnesota Cavalry Battalion or simply "Hatch's Battalion". Hatch's cavalry battalion was to serve in the ensuing Sioux Wars under the Department of the Northwest, however, the unit never saw any major engagement in the punitive campaigns against the Dakota by Henry Hastings Sibley and Alfred Sully.

Hatch's Battalion was responsible for the kidnapping of two Dakota leaders accused of taking part in the Dakota War of 1862, those two leaders being Shakopee III and Wakan Ozanzan (Dakota: Holy Light) also called Medicine Bottle, who were captured at Fort Garry in January, 1864. The two Mdewakanton Dakota men were later executed by hanging at Fort Snelling on November 11, 1865. Hatch resigned his command of the battalion in the spring of 1864 and was replaced by Charles Powell Adams.

== Personal life ==
Hatch was married to Charlotte C. B. Pierson; together they had 6 children. Charlotte's father, Azariah Pierson, was an Indian agent and one of the founding fathers of Freemasonry in the state of Minnesota. During his time Azariah was the Grand Recorder, Grand Secretary, and eventually the Grand Master for the Grand Lodge of Minnesota. In 1882 Azariah wrote The Traditions, Origin and Early History of Freemasonry which details the traditions and history of Freemasonry along with Masonic rituals and customs.

== Later life and death ==
Following his military career Hatch worked for James J. Hill and the Saint Paul, Minneapolis and Manitoba Railway which later became the Great Northern Railway. Aside from the railroad industry Hatch owned a creamery in Saint Paul, Minnesota near the Winona Road which produced cheese. The factory was equipped with a steam engine and was insured for $3,800 and valued at $4,500 in 1875. Hatch died on August 13, 1882 at the age of 57 in his home on Pleasant Avenue in St. Paul, Minnesota due to complications of Cholera Morbus. He is buried in Oakland Cemetery in St. Paul.
