= Thomas J. Galbraith =

American politician

Member of the Minnesota Territorial House of Representatives
- In office 1856–1856

Member of the Minnesota Senate
- In office 1861–1861
- Constituency: 18th District

Personal details
- Born: October 3, 1825
- Died: February 22, 1909 (aged 83) Cheyenne, Wyoming, United States
- Party: Republican
- Occupation: Politician, Indian agent

Thomas J. Galbraith (October 3, 1825 – February 22, 1909) was an American politician. In 1857, he signed the Republican version of the Minnesota State Constitution. Galbraith served in the Minnesota Territorial House of Representatives in 1856. He then served the 18th district in the Minnesota State Senate in 1861, living in Scott County at the time. In 1862, Galbraith worked as an Indian agent for the Bureau of Indian Affairs at the Lower Sioux Agency, succeeding Joseph R. Brown.

On August 15, 1862, he was involved in a confrontation with Mdewakanton tribesmen and his trading partner Andrew Myrick at the Lower Sioux Agency. Galbraith refused to distribute food on credit, although they were suffering hunger and the government's treaty annuity was late. It proved one of many causes of the Dakota War of 1862 that began twelve days later. Myrick, who made derogatory comments in the incident, was killed on August 18, 1862 while Galbraith managed to escape. When the hostilities were over he compiled a list of the known Minnesotans casualties both civilian and military. He died in Cheyenne, Wyoming February 3, 1909, where he was a resident for many years.
