= Philander Prescott =

Philander Prescott (September 17, 1801 – August 18, 1862) was an American trader, interpreter, and pioneer of Wisconsin and Minnesota. The town of Prescott, Wisconsin was first settled by and named after him.

== Biography ==
Philander Prescott was the son of Dr. Joel Prescott and Phildelia Reed. He was a native of Phelps, Ontario County, New York. He headed west in the spring of 1819, stopping a few months in Detroit, Michigan Territory, before continuing west to Fort Snelling, then also in Michigan Territory.

In 1823, he married Na-he-no-Wenah (Spirit of the Moon), also known as Mary Ke E Hi, daughter of Man-Who-Flies, a Dakota subchief who lived near Bde Maka Ska. She was born c. 1804–1806 and died on March 29, 1867, at Shakopee, Minnesota. They had sons, William Prescott; Hiram Prescott (born December 21, 1831 or 1832); and Lorenzo Taliferro Prescott (c. 1839 – January 2, 1869); as well as a daughter, Lucy Prescott Pettijohn; and two more children.

During his life on the frontier, he served as a government interpreter of the Dakota language (including for the Treaty of Traverse des Sioux). He worked as a miner, a trapper, and on a steamboat on the Mississippi River. He also ran trading posts, in several locations, and farmed.

From 1839 to 1862, he operated a trading post along the St. Croix River – its location became the town of Prescott, Wisconsin, named for him.

== Death ==
He was killed at the Lower Sioux (or Redwood) Agency during the Dakota War of 1862 in the Attack at the Lower Sioux Agency; he was buried in the Minneapolis Pioneers and Soldiers Memorial Cemetery, as were his wife and son.

His papers are in the Minnesota Historical Society library.

== See also ==
- Attack at the Lower Sioux Agency
