= Lower Sioux Agency =

- U.S. National Register of Historic Places
- Minnesota State Register of Historic Places
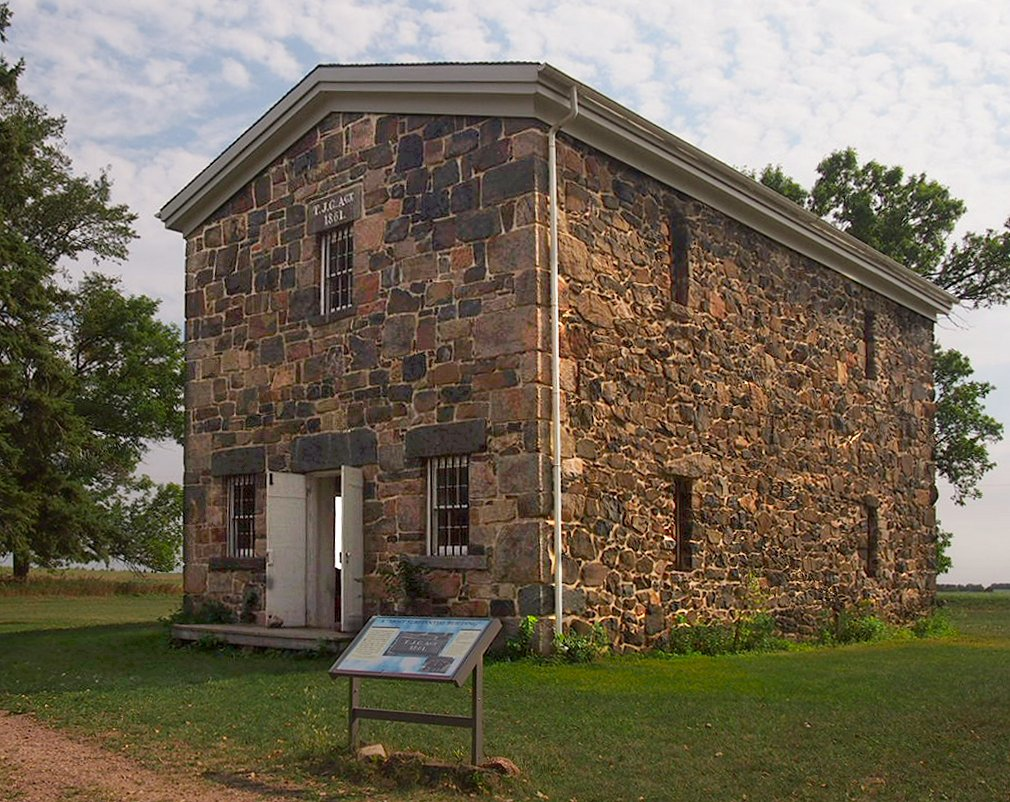
- The Lower Sioux Agency warehouse from the northwest
- Location: 32469 County Hwy. 2, Sherman Township, Redwood County, Minnesota, USA
- Nearest city: Morton, Minnesota
- Coordinates: 44°31′34″N 94°57′28″W
- Area: 122.86 acres (49.72 ha)
- Built: 1853–1862
- NRHP reference No.: 70000308 (original); 100009222 (increase)

Significant dates
- Added to NRHP: September 22, 1970
- Boundary increase: August 29, 2025

The Lower Sioux Agency, or Redwood Agency, was the federal administrative center for the Lower Sioux Indian Reservation in what became Redwood County, Minnesota, United States. It was the site of the Battle of Lower Sioux Agency on August 18, 1862, the first organized battle of the Dakota War of 1862.

Today it is a historic site managed by the Lower Sioux Community in partnership with the Minnesota Historical Society. In February 2021, ownership of half of the site was transferred from the historical society to the Lower Sioux Community. The site contains an interpretive center, self-guided trails, and a restored 1861 stone warehouse that is listed on the National Register of Historic Places.

== History ==
The Lower Sioux Agency was established in 1853 by the United States government, to oversee the newly created Lower Sioux Indian Reservation. This reservation was to be the home for the Mdewakanton and Wahpekute bands following the 1851 Treaty of Mendota.

On August 15, 1862, the Lower Sioux turned to the Agency staff for supplies. Representatives of the northern Sissetowan and Wahpeton Dakota bands had successfully negotiated to obtain food at the Upper Sioux Agency on August 4. However Thomas J. Galbraith, the Indian agent in charge, rejected the Lower Sioux bands, as he would not distribute food to these bands without payment from their annuities, which were delayed. At a meeting of the Dakota, the U.S. government, and local traders, the Dakota representatives asked the representative of the government traders, Andrew J. Myrick, to sell them food on credit. His response was said to be, "So far as I am concerned, if they are hungry let them eat grass or their own dung."

On August 16, 1862, the treaty payments to the Dakota arrived in St. Paul, Minnesota, and were brought to Fort Ridgely the next day. They arrived too late to prevent violence. On August 17, 1862, four young Dakota men were on a hunting trip in Acton Township, Minnesota, during which one stole eggs and killed five white settlers. Soon after, a Dakota war council was convened and their leader, Little Crow, agreed to continue attacks on the European-American settlements to try to drive out the whites from their territory.

Trading House at the Lower Sioux Agency after the U.S.-Dakota War of 1862

On August 18, 1862, Little Crow led a group of warriors who attacked the Lower Sioux Agency. They discovered Andrew Myrick trying to escape through a second-floor window of a building at the agency. Myrick's body later was found with grass stuffed into his mouth because of his recent statement to the Dakota (See above). The warriors burned the buildings at the Lower Sioux Agency, giving enough time for settlers to escape across the river at Redwood Ferry.

Minnesota militia forces and B Company of the 5th Minnesota Volunteer Infantry Regiment sent to quell the uprising were defeated at the Battle of Redwood Ferry. Twenty-four soldiers, including the party's commander (Captain John Marsh), were killed in the battle. Throughout the day, Dakota war parties swept the Minnesota River Valley and near vicinity, killing many settlers. Numerous settlements, including the Townships of Milford, Leavenworth, and Sacred Heart, were surrounded and burned, and their populations nearly exterminated.

At the conclusion of the Dakota War, most of the Sissetowan and Wahpeton bands were driven out of Minnesota, west to Dakota Territory. Today the Sisseton-Wahpeton Oyate is a federally recognized tribe with a reservation in northeastern South Dakota and southwestern North Dakota.

== Current use ==
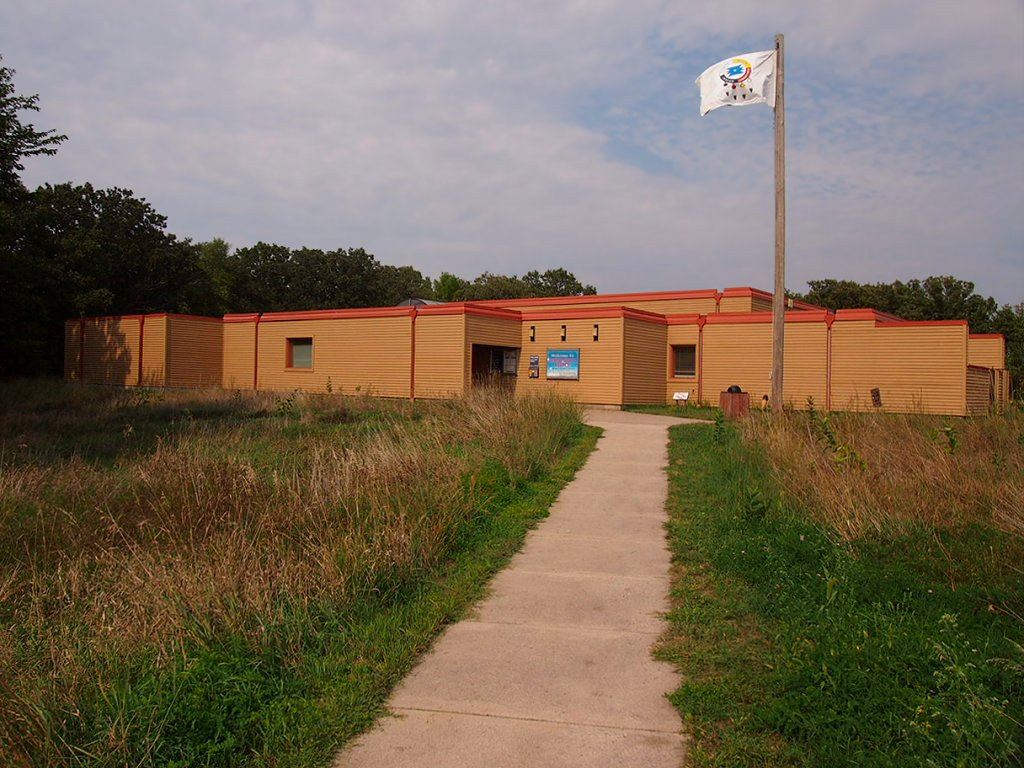
The Lower Sioux Agency Interpretive Center

Self-guided trails take visitors around the site. The 1861 granary is the only surviving structure from the agency. Interpretive signs mark the locations of other features, including the location of the Redwood Ferry crossing the Minnesota River. Period gardens and plots demonstrate differences between traditional Dakota and Euro-American farming.
