= Melville Wilkinson =

American soldier (1835-1898)

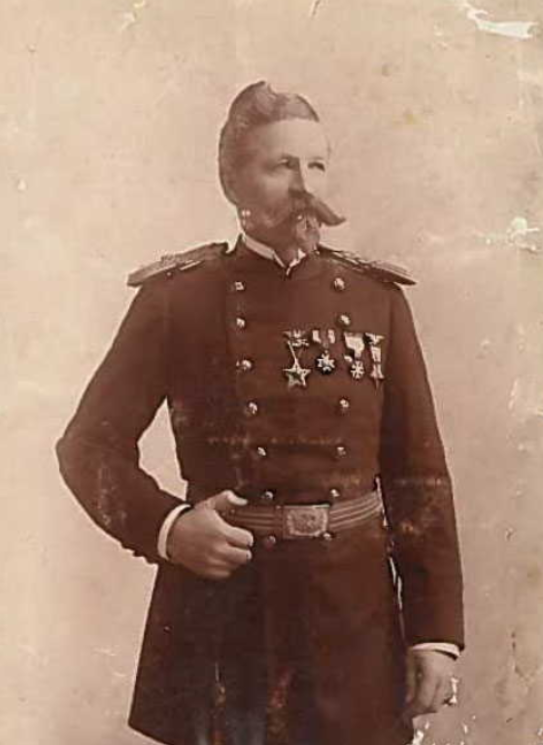
- Born: November 14, 1835; Scottsburg, New York, United States
- Died: October 5, 1898 (aged 62) near Leech Lake, Minnesota, United States
- Burial place: Fort Snelling National Cemetery
- Military career
- Allegiance: United States
- Branch: United States Army (Union Army)
- Service years: 1861–1898
- Rank: Major
- Unit: 3rd Infantry Regiment
- Conflicts: American Civil War; Battle of Antietam; Indian Wars; Nez Perce War; Columbia River Massacre; Battle of Sugar Point †

Melville Cary Wilkinson (November 14, 1835 – October 5, 1898) was an American soldier and educator. He was the founder and superintendent of the Forest Grove Indian School (later changed to Chemawa Indian School), at Salem, Oregon. He also worked at Howard University, where he taught military subjects to Black students.

Wilkinson was a veteran of the U.S. Civil War and the Indian Wars. He was killed by Ojibwe Indians at the Battle of Sugar Point in 1898 during a state of unrest.

== Early life ==
Melville Cary Wilkinson was born in Scottsburg, New York, on November 14, 1835. His father was a Methodist Reverend who raised him to be devoutly religious. He worked during his early years in the mercantile and railroad businesses. At the onset of the American Civil War, Wilkinson enlisted in the Union Army, and was promoted to Lieutenant and Captain in the 107th New York Volunteer Infantry.

== Military and educational career ==
During the Battle of Antietam on September 17, 1862, Wilkinson was injured and forced to serve the remainder of the war as an officer in the Veterans Reserve Corps.

=== Howard University ===
After the war, Wilkinson decided to turn to teaching. For a year he taught military science at Howard University, and then was appointed as an aide-de-camp to Major General Oliver Otis Howard––then President of Howard University and the Commissioner of the Freedman’s Bureau. It was during this time when Wilkinson made his first significant contribution to Indian education. While Howard University’s main focus at the time was to educate freed slaves, Wilkinson argued that there should also be an opportunity for Indians to attend the college. In 1872, Wilkinson spent a year with General Howard in the Southwest, helping to resolve problems with the Apache tribe. Between 1871 and 1875, Howard successfully enrolled several Indian children. This was an early milestone for the creation of off-reservation boarding schools, which Wilkinson would later be a part of.

=== Participation in Indian removal ===
In 1873, Wilkinson was present for the removal of the Modoc tribe from Fort McPherson, to Indian territory. Additionally, he participated in the Nez Perce War in 1877.

==== Paiute-Bannock War, 1878 ====
In 1878, Wilkinson was in the command of a gunboat near Wallula on the Columbia River. There, where his men were armed with guns and muskets, he ordered them to fire on a group of non-combatant Palouse Indians — men, women, and children. The scene was so grotesque and horrifying that one eyewitness reported that, Wilkinson, after taking control of the field piece himself, unleashed a stream of bullets that when he was done, the Indians lay on the ground in all directions. Within several weeks of this incident, Wilkinson had taken a leave of absence and was in search of a new career.

=== Later career ===
In March 1879, Wilkinson moved to Washington, D.C. There, he befriended Richard Henry Pratt, who shared similar views about Indian assimilation, specifically that a military solution was not the answer. In Washington, the two men successfully lobbied Secretary of Interior, Carl Shurz, Secretary of War George W. McCrary, and Commissioner of Indian Affairs Ezra A. Hayt, who agreed to establish two off-reservation boarding schools. Two months later, the federal government had given its approval for Forest Grove Indian school in Oregon, and Carlisle Indian School in Pennsylvania. Under an 1886 Act of Congress, Wilkinson was named the superintendent of Forest Grove. This gave the President the authority to appoint army officers as military instructors and professors.

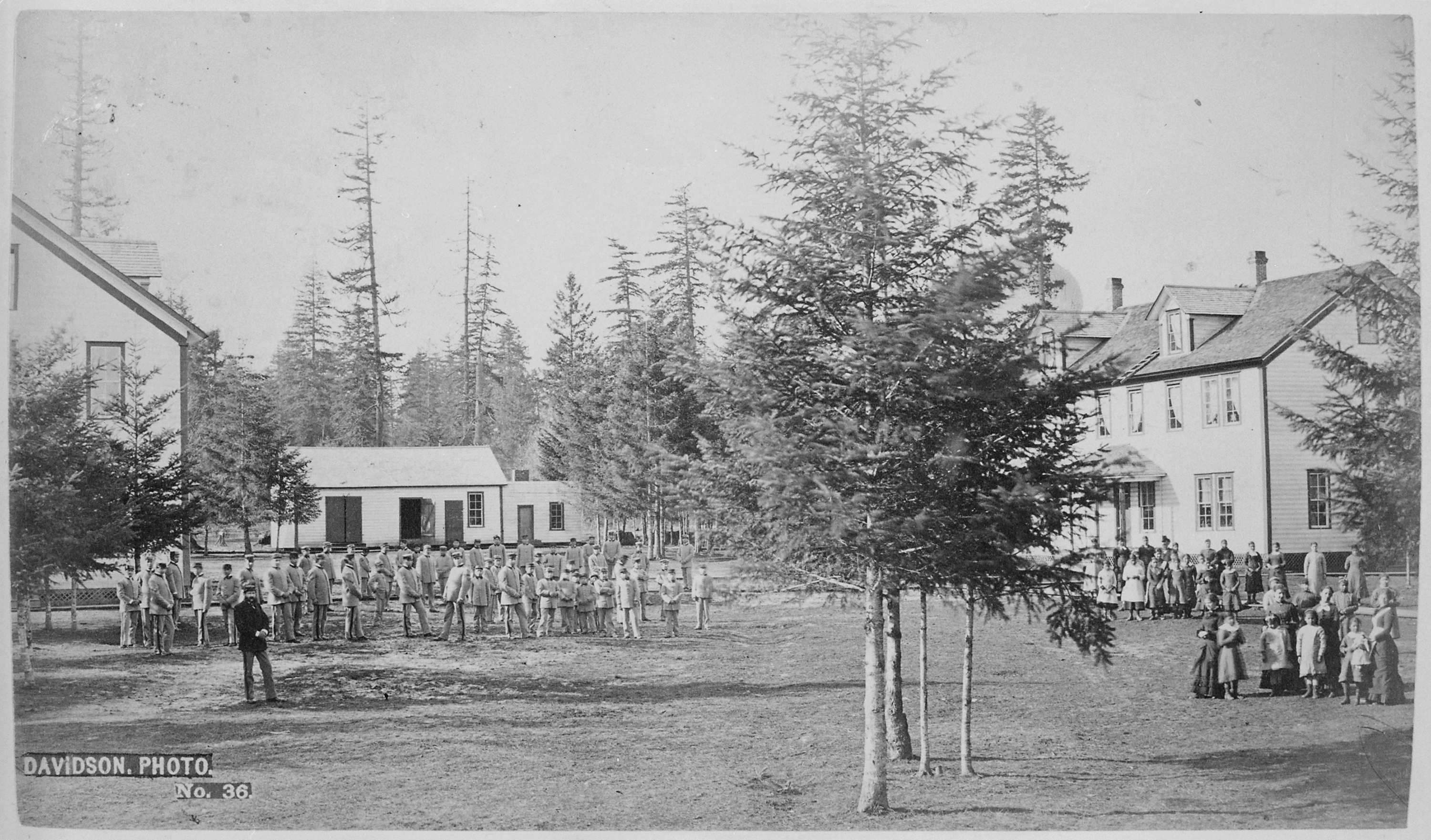
Forest Grove Indian School, 1882

== Forest Grove Indian Training School ==
Wilkinson was an ardent assimilationist. United States Indian Policy shifted in the late 1870s from one of separation on reservations to one of assimilation. By 1880, the United States government had overtaken the Indians, and tribal sovereignty was no more. Students would now be forced to attend either day schools or boarding schools, many of which would be far from their homes. Wilkinson, like other reformers, wanted to prepare Native American children for assimilation into white society. Forest Grove was the second off-reservation school to be established by the U.S. government, and was structured similarly to that of the Carlisle School, established by Richard Pratt.

=== The Beginning of Forest Grove ===
After Forest Grove was approved in 1879, Wilkinson brought his first group of Native American children to the school from the Puyallup Reservation in Washington. The children themselves constructed the first school buildings. Wilkinson had extreme difficulty accumulating funding for his school. While he was originally given $5000 in funding, he was unable to accumulate any significant amount, most likely due to the unpopularity of the school in the surrounding areas.

=== Students and families ===
While Wilkinson was described as having a strong personality, he was also described as being erratic and unpredictable in his methods, which caused him to gain extremely harsh criticism. Because of his philosophical views about the boarding school education, Wilkinson went to great lengths to prevent students from contacting their parents. While he made the effort to correspond with the children’s parents and tribal chiefs to assure them that they were safe, he would not allow the children to contact their families themselves. Additionally, he would often remove Indian children from reservations, taking them to Forest Grove against the will of their parents, and often the children themselves. Upon the death of students at the school, Wilkinson alone where and how the children would be buried, with complete disregard to the wishes of the students’ families.

=== Discipline ===
Discipline was modeled after army discipline; boys and girls were divided into groups based on gender, with four sergeants in charge of each group. One student described that everything was “carried on with military precision,” referencing the bell that was rung to signal the beginning and end of tasks and activities. Wilkinson used these military drills to promote the school––all visitors would automatically be given a parade of military drills.

=== Removal ===
Wilkinson’s conduct earned him considerable criticism. While he was able to keep attendance high at Forest Grove because of his forcible recruitments, death and desertion continued to lower the attendance numbers. By 1883, Wilkinson was removed from superintendent of the school after an unfavorable report was submitted by a U.S. Indian inspector, when one of the school buildings was burned down by students. As a result, the United States government refused to extend Wilkinson’s leave from the army. Even his old friend, Richard Pratt, was unsympathetic, going to show just how much of a liability Wilkinson really was.

== Death ==
Major Wilkinson was stationed at Fort Snelling in Minnesota in 1898. During this time, a local Ojibwe Indian chief named Bugonaygeshig was arrested by a U.S. Marshal. However, a mob of Ojibwe men came and freed Bugonaygeshig from custody. The U.S. Marshal then fled to Fort Snelling, where he requested military assistance. Wilkinson and his Army company were then assigned to subdue the Ojibwe fugitives.

Wilkinson and his men were sent on a steamboat to Sugar Point, a peninsula on Leech Lake where the cabin of Chief Bugonaygeshig was located. Shortly after they landed at Sugar Point, the U.S. troops and Ojibwe Indians began to fire at each other, which began the Battle of Sugar Point on October 5, 1898. Wilkinson was shot in the leg early on in the battle, and was taken behind cover to treat his wound. However, Wilkinson soon got up again and returned to the battle to rally his soldiers. Wilkinson was then killed after being shot in the stomach by the Ojibwe.
