= George R. Wicker =

American politician

- George R. Wicker; Minnesota State Representative

Member of the Minnesota House of Representatives from the 5th district
- In office 1917–1921

Personal details
- Born: March 17, 1877 Nielsville, Minnesota, U.S.
- Died: January 26, 1935 (aged 57) Washington, D.C., U.S.
- Party: Republican
- Spouse: Nora Lewison Wicker
- Children: Mertyl Wicker; Ruth Wicker; George Rollis (Kelly) Wicker
- Profession: Businessman; Agricultural accounting Agricultural cooperatives Accountant; Lawmaker

Military service
- Branch/service: United States Army; Fort Snelling
- Years of service: 1898–1899
- Rank: Private
- Unit: 3rd US Infantry; Company E
- Battles/wars: Spanish–American War "The Battle of Sugar Point" Wounded in action

George R. Wicker, 1898 – Spanish–American War. Wounded in action during The Battle of Sugar Point, October 5, 1898, Leech Lake while fighting against the Chippewa Indians.

George R. Wicker as an editor in 1900.

George R. Wicker (March 17, 1877 – January 26, 1935) was an American agricultural businessman, agricultural accountant, and lawmaker as a State Representative for Minnesota. He worked for the Minnesota Department of Agriculture as Commissioner, the Illinois Farm Bureau, the Illinois Department of Agriculture, and the United States Department of Agriculture (USDA) as the Chief of the Investigative Service for the Agricultural Adjustment Administration (Triple A). Wicker was the first CEO of Growmark, Inc. in Bloomington, Illinois, from 1927 to 1929.

== Background and family ==
Growmark was born in Nielsville, Minnesota, to John Wicker and Annie Gilbertson, who had immigrated from Germany and Norway, respectively. He married Nora B. Lewison on Jul 10, 1899, in Hayfield, Minnesota. George and Nora had three children, Mertyl Geraldine Wicker, Ruth Wicker, and George (Kelly) Rollis Wicker.

== Military service (Spanish–American War) ==
While living in Hayfield, Minnesota, he enlisted in the United States Army (in St. Paul, Minn) at the age of 21 on June 20, 1898. Wicker was in Company E and wounded in action at Leech Lake on October 5, 1898; discharged on January 4, 1899, at Fort Snelling, Minnesota.

Wicker and his soon to be brother-in-law Lewis Lewison enlisted for service in the Spanish–American War. The war was short lived ending before George and Lew were deployed into active duty. Federal Marshals requested military assistance from Fort Snelling concerning issues with the Ojibway tribe of American Indians in Northern Minnesota. In response the Minnesota 3rd Infantry was dispatched to Leech Lake in Walker, Minnesota, on October 4, 1898.

The conflict is to be known as "The Battle of Sugar Point" and is the last recorded battle between U.S. Army troops and American Indians. The Battle of Sugar Point, or the Battle of Leech Lake, was fought on October 5, 1898, between the 3rd Infantry and members of the Pillager Band of Chippewa Indians in a failed attempt to apprehend Pillager Ojibwe Bugonaygeshig ("Old Bug" or "Hole-In-The-Day"), as the result of a dispute with Indian Service officials on the Leech Lake Reservation in Cass County, Minnesota. Often referred to as "the last Indian Uprising in the United States", the engagement is also the first battle to be fought in the Northwest United States since the Winnebago War in 1827. It is considered by American War Historians to be the last battle fought between Native Americans and the U.S. Army.

The engagement has cost the lives of one officer, Captain Wilkinson and five men. Among the ten that were injured were five Minnesotans, Privates; George R. Wicker, Charles M. Turner, Edward Brown, Jes S. Jensen, and Gottfried Ziegler.

== After the Spanish–American War ==
In 1899 Wicker wrote and published ("In the Battle with the Chippewas," which appeared in the Illustrated Home Journal of St. Louis on April 1, 1899) his war experience with the American Indians at Sugar Point Minnesota. In his writings he mentions that the American Indians (Red man) was merely rightfully fighting for the land that they (the Chippewas) deserve and have lived on far longer than the white man. George R. Wicker also states that if the tables were turned, the white man would have fought as feverishly as the American Indians have should their land be raped and pillaged by outsiders.

An excerpt from the article reads;

"I must confess, wrote George Wicker, "that I dreaded to fire my gun at the unfortunate red man. I felt that he was but fighting for the land, country, and the rights that were his, fighting, it is true, in his own peculiar and treacherous way. Later on I learned that these sentiments were shared by many of those who with me at the time wore blue. There were and are men in high places who have oppressed, defrauded, robbed, insulted, maltreated the Indian, the rightful owner of this country, until the poor savage could no longer endure his wrongs," declared Wicker. "He, too, loves his forests, lakes, streams, his native soil." ("In the Battle with the Chippewas," George Wicker, Illustrated Home Journal of St. Louis on April 1, 1899)

(From the Minnesota Historical Society) A photostatic copy of an article by George Wicker entitled "In the Battle with the Chippewa," which appeared in the Illustrated Home Journal of St. Louis for April 1, 1899, has been received from Miss Lillian Wicker of St. Paul, a sister of the author. Wicker was a member of the expedition that went to Leech Lake in October, 1898, to suppress the Indian uprising of that year, and he here records his experiences, particularly in the battle of October 5. The article was copied from a rare file 1941 ACCESSIONS 89 of the Journal in the possession of the publishers, the Louis Lange Publishing Company of St. Louis.

George R. Wicker as a young politician/Minnesota State Representative 1917-1922

From 1900 to 1903, Wicker worked an editor in Hayfield. From 1903 to 1906, he served in the State Legislative Staff for the Minnesota Senate (Committee on Taxes and Tax Laws Clerk). From 1906 to 1916 he managed a lumberyard in Hayfield and worked with the Minnesota State Senate.

=== Minnesota State Representative ===
In 1916 Wicker was elected into the Minnesota State Legislature as a State Representative for District 5 and was in the following committees; Education, Elections, Markets and Marketing, Military Affairs, Motor Vehicles, Taxes. Representative George Wicker was instrumental in getting funds allocated for the Minnesota War Records Commission during his term with the legislature. The commission collected information and memorabilia regarding the military and publishing a special report regarding the Battle of Sugar Point in which George R. Wicker participated.

=== Wicker–Nolan Bill Creating Minnesota Department of State Police ===
In 1921, William I. Nolan and George R. Wicker introduced a bill (Wicker-Nolan Bill) to create a State Public Safety Commission to co-ordinate the activities of all public peace and prosecuting officers. The bill passed the Senate 41 to 22. Minnesota Governor J. A. O. Preus supported the bill to create a 100-man Department of State Police to act as peace officers. In a special message to the 1921 Legislature Governor J. A. O. Preus opened the CA's long campaign for a state constabulary. A "terrific" wave of crime was sweeping across the nation, and a state constabulary was the only way to deal with it effectively. CA publications supported Preus's efforts to stomp out the new wave of youthful criminals that was attributed to movies, pool halls, and war experience. Preus supported a bill to create a 100-man Department of State Police to act as peace officers. Despite a clause that the force "shall not be employed in strikes arising out of labor controversies between employers and employees;' the legislature, probably realizing that labor opposition would doom the bill, ignored Preus's effort. Instead William I. Nolan and George Wicker introduced a bill to create a State Public Safety Commission to coordinate the activities of all public peace and prosecuting officers.

=== Minnesota Cooperative Act of 1919 ===
George Wicker authored the Minnesota Cooperative Act of 1919. George Wicker testified during the Revenue Act of 1926 Hearings on H.R. 1 Before the Senate Committee on Finance, 69th United States Congress, 1st Sess. (July 1926), 261–274. George R. Wicker was representing the Illinois Agricultural Association, and testifying on behalf of several national and State cooperative and farm organizations.

These laws were originally enacted principally to insure to groups of farmers the right to act collectively without violating state antitrust statutes. Congress assured to cooperatives the same immunity from United States antitrust law by enactment of the Capper–Volstead Act in 1922. Neither state nor federal law grants such immunity to cooperatives in their ordinary commercial transactions and dealings.

=== 1921 to 1924 Minnesota State Department of Agriculture ===
In 1921 George Wicker was appointed Deputy Commissioner of the Minnesota State Department of Agriculture.

=== 1924 to 1927 Illinois Agricultural Auditing Association & co-ops ===
What is now the Illinois Agricultural Auditing Association was organized as the Illinois Agricultural Cooperative Association. Vernon Vaniman of Virden was hired as fieldman, and George Wicker of Minnesota was hired as Director/manager.

Agricultural accounting. From The Cornell Daily Sun: "The different forms of organization found in co-operatives have created a demand for a special kind of agricultural accountants. The Agricultural Association of Illinois established a department of business, service to supply this need. This department audits the books of the member companies at regular rates, and helps the co-operatives find the cause of financial losses. George R. Wicker, Manager of the Illinois Agricultural Co-operative Association, spoke on the business management of country grain elevators. Their history was traced from the time when they were organized as corporations principally handling grain, to the present."

=== 1927 to 1929 founding of Growmark, Inc. ===
George Wicker was the director of the Illinois Agricultural Cooperative Association and outlined a sound financial policy for (Illinois Farm Supply), now Growmark, Inc. covering working capital, extension of credit, and dealers contracts. And so it began. Illinois Farm Supply was created as a wholesale distributor of petroleum and lubricant products. From the beginning, IAA and Farm Supply leaders insisted on clean-cut business practices, top-grade service, and enforceable contracts between Illinois Farm Supply and member cooperatives. In 1927 George R. Wicker was appointed the first CEO of Growmark, Inc. (an agricultural co-op) based in Bloomington, Illinois. Growmark, Inc. is now an $8 billion company.
