= Marsha F. Small =

Cheyenne Researcher and Activist

- Otá'taveenóvá'e
- Born: Northern Cheyenne Reservation
- Other name: blue tipi woman
- Education: Montana State University
- Occupations: Researcher, instructor, and activist

Marsha F. Small (Cheyenne: Otá'taveenóvá'e, transl. blue tipi woman) is the co-founder and leader of the Indigenous Peoples Day Montana movement, and a scholar in Earth Sciences and Native American Studies whose work has focused on preservation, conservation, and reconciliation of sacred sites and places, specifically of boarding school cemeteries. She has worked on projects and uncovered unmarked graves at Chemawa Indian School in Salem, Oregon and Red Cloud Indian School in Oglala Lakota County, South Dakota.

== Life and education ==
Marsha Small is Northern Cheyenne and grew up on the Northern Cheyenne Reservation in Montana. She graduated high school in 1975, and completed an associate's degree from Chief Dull Knife College, and a bachelor's degree in environmental science and policy from Southern Oregon University in 2009. Small attended Montana State University for her master's degree in Native American Studies, which she received in 2015. Small is currently working on her Ph.D. in Earth Science at MSU.

== Career and research ==
During Small's MSU master's work she undertook a research project to use ground penetrating radar to map the unmarked grave sites of indigenous children who died at the Chemawa Indian School cemetery near Salem, Oregon. Chemawa is one of the oldest government-run Indian boarding schools, and Small's work includes restoring names, finding causes of death, and assisting families in bringing their loved ones home, or following cultural protocols to re-bury and mark graves. Small's initial scans took place in 2012, but she realized she needed further training and understanding of ground penetrating radar, and worked with Jarrod Burks, an archaeologist who conducts surveys for the Defense POW/MIS Accounting Agency, to re-conduct the survey in 2019. Small's initial study included inaccuracies and in-correct identifications but the new survey from 2019 included additional technology and Small and Burks were able to provide more clarity and create a more cogent analysis. Through their data, they identified 222 possible graves, (previously only 204 marked graves had been identified) with the potential for more.

In 2021/2022, Small was invited to Red Cloud Indian School to learn if children were buried in the campus' Drexel Hall basement. During Small's trip to Red Cloud in May 2022, she found two anomalies consistent with possible graves. In October 2022, excavation of the anomaly sites was completed, but no human remains were found. Small is seeking to expand the project to 23 other off-reservation cemetery sites throughout the United States. In 2021, Small, along with scholars Farina King and Preston McBride created protocols for surveying Indian boarding school burial sites.

For over a decade, Small has advocated for the establishment of Indigenous Peoples Day in the state of Montana and testified in support of a bill to establish Indigenous Peoples Day in Montana several times. Previous iterations of the legislation eliminated Columbus Day, but in 2025, Senator Shane Morigeau and other supporters sponsored (Montana) Senate Bill 224: Create Indigenous Peoples Day to allow for Montanans to celebrate either or both holidays. Senate Bill 224 was signed into law on May 8, 2025.

In 2021, Small, along with scholars Farina King and Preston McBride created protocols for surveying Indian boarding school burial sites.

Small served as the Teppola Distinguished Visiting Professor at Willamette University's department of Anthropology. In 2020, Small was the Society for Conservation Geographical Informational Systems Tribal Scholar.

== Publications and works ==
- Native American and Indigenous Protocols For Surveying Indian Boarding School Burial Sites
- With Mary S. Hubbard, "Unlocking The Gates: Correlating Ground Penetrating Radar (GPR) and Geographical Information Systems (GIS) For The Location of Indian Children In Historic Indian Boarding School Cemeteries" from The Geological Society of America Annual Meeting in Seattle, Washington, 2017.
