= Nielsville, Minnesota =

City in Minnesota, United States

- City
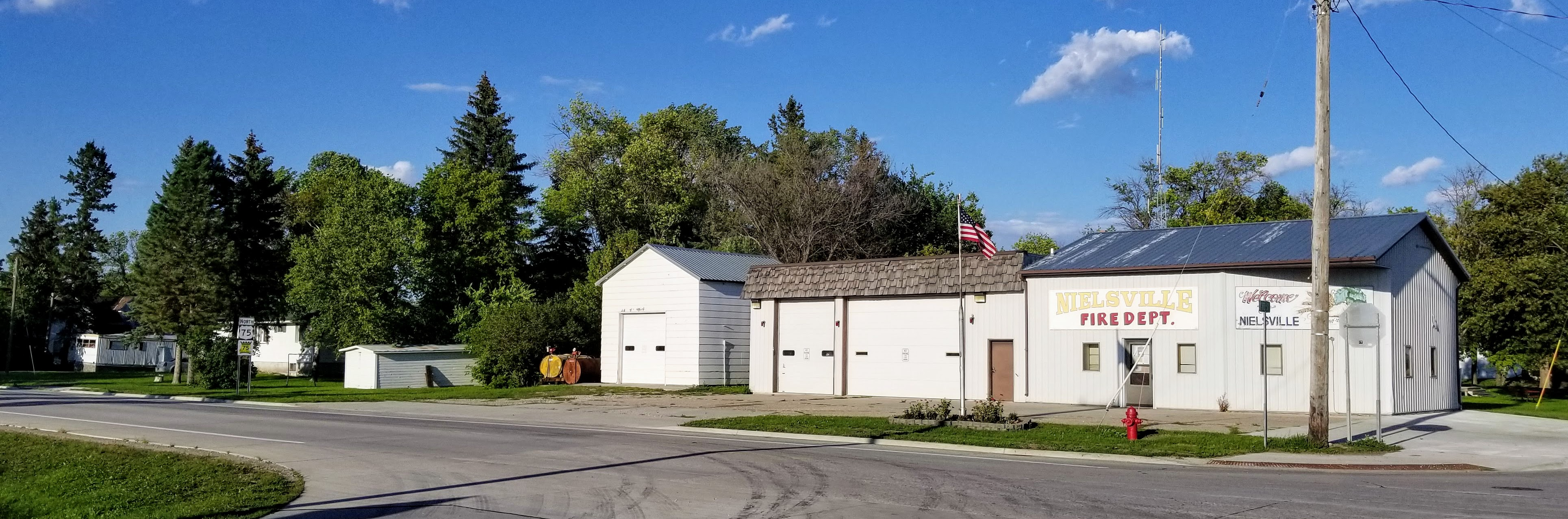
- Buildings along U.S. Route 75 in Nielsville.

- Location of Nielsville, Minnesota
- Coordinates: 47°31′46″N 96°48′57″W
- Country: United States
- State: Minnesota
- County: Polk
- Incorporated: May 7, 1920

Government
  - Mayor: David Vraa

Area
  - Total: 0.289 sq mi (0.749 km^{2})
  - Land: 0.289 sq mi (0.749 km^{2})
  - Water: 0 sq mi (0.000 km^{2})
- Elevation: 866 ft (264 m)

Population (2020)
  - Total: 78
  - Estimate (2022): 78
  - Density: 269.7/sq mi (104.13/km^{2})
- Time zone: UTC−6 (Central (CST))
  - Summer (DST): UTC−5 (CDT)
- ZIP Code: 56568
- Area code: 218
- FIPS code: 27-46258
- GNIS feature ID: 2395234
- Sales tax: 7.125%

Nielsville (/ˈniːlzvɪl/ NEELZ-vil) is a city in Polk County, Minnesota, United States. It is part of the Grand Forks, ND-MN Metropolitan Statistical Area. The population was 78 at the 2020 census.

== History ==
A post office has been in operation at Nielsville since 1883. Nielsville formerly had a depot on the railroad.

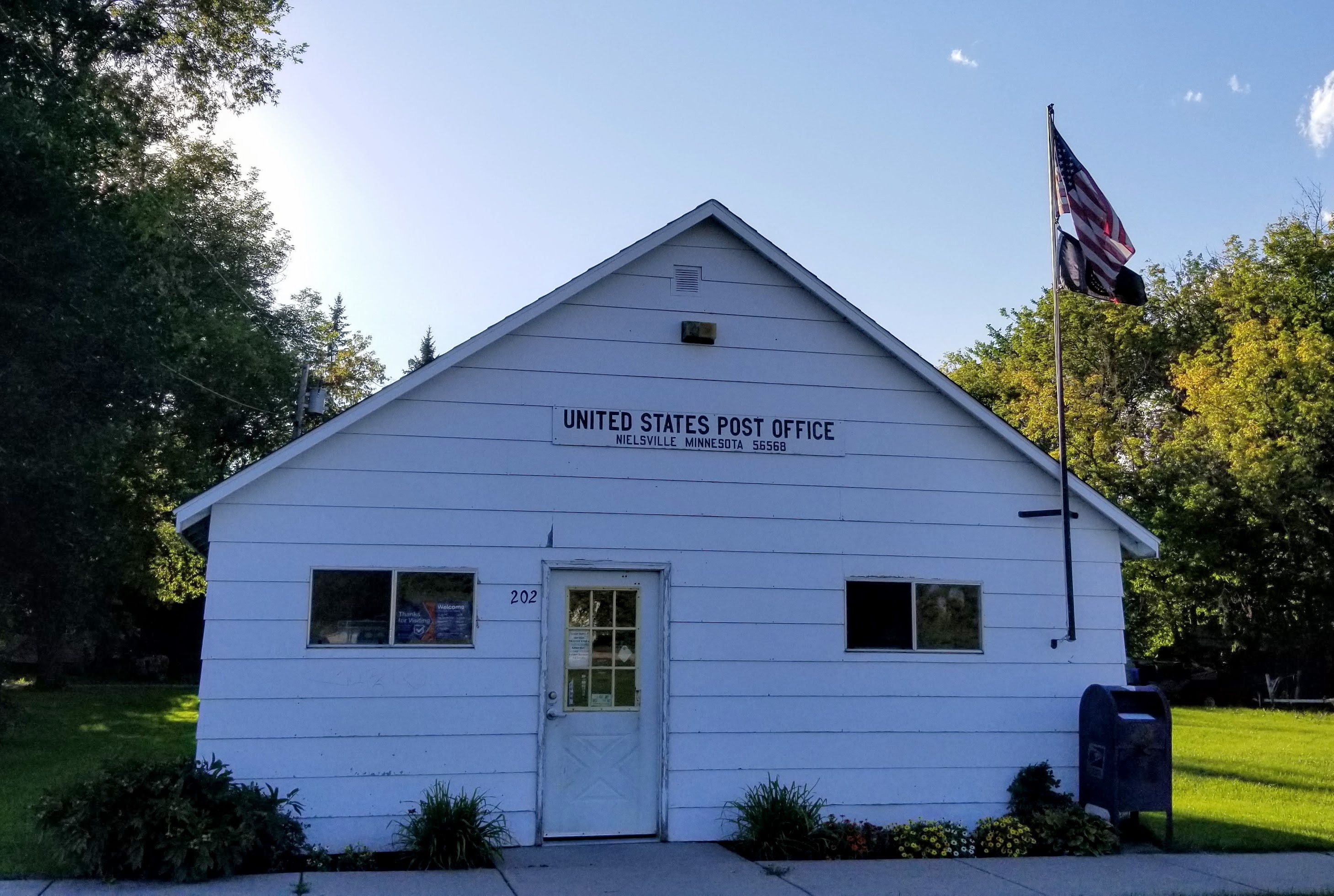
The Nielsville post office.

== Geography ==
According to the United States Census Bureau, the city has a total area of 0.289 square miles (0.75 km^{2}), all land.

== Demographics ==
Historical population
| Census | Pop. | Note | %± |
|---|---|---|---|
| 1930 | 186 | | — |
| 1940 | 175 | | −5.9% |
| 1950 | 189 | | 8.0% |
| 1960 | 183 | | −3.2% |
| 1970 | 156 | | −14.8% |
| 1980 | 145 | | −7.1% |
| 1990 | 96 | | −33.8% |
| 2000 | 91 | | −5.2% |
| 2010 | 90 | | −1.1% |
| 2020 | 78 | | −13.3% |
| 2022 (est.) | 78 | | 0.0% |
U.S. Decennial Census; 2020 Census

=== 2010 census ===
As of the 2010 census, there were 90 people, 42 households, and 19 families living in the city. The population density was 250.0 inhabitants per square mile (96.5/km^{2}). There were 56 housing units at an average density of 155.6 per square mile (60.1/km^{2}). The racial makeup of the city was 93.3% White, 5.6% from other races, and 1.1% from two or more races. Hispanic or Latino of any race were 23.3% of the population.

There were 42 households, of which 23.8% had children under the age of 18 living with them, 35.7% were married couples living together, 4.8% had a female householder with no husband present, 4.8% had a male householder with no wife present, and 54.8% were non-families. 52.4% of all households were made up of individuals, and 19.1% had someone living alone who was 65 years of age or older. The average household size was 2.14 and the average family size was 3.32.

The median age in the city was 46 years. 23.3% of residents were under the age of 18; 9% were between the ages of 18 and 24; 12.2% were from 25 to 44; 43.4% were from 45 to 64; and 12.2% were 65 years of age or older. The gender makeup of the city was 46.7% male and 53.3% female.

=== 2000 census ===
As of the 2000 census, there were 91 people, 40 households, and 23 families living in the city. The population density was 329.9 inhabitants per square mile (127.4/km^{2}). There were 50 housing units at an average density of 181.3 per square mile (70.0/km^{2}). The racial makeup of the city was 96.70% White, and 3.30% from two or more races. Hispanic or Latino of any race were 9.89% of the population.

There were 40 households, out of which 30.0% had children under the age of 18 living with them, 42.5% were married couples living together, 7.5% had a female householder with no husband present, and 42.5% were non-families. 40.0% of all households were made up of individuals, and 20.0% had someone living alone who was 65 years of age or older. The average household size was 2.28 and the average family size was 3.09.

In the city, the population was spread out, with 24.2% under the age of 18, 11.0% from 18 to 24, 20.9% from 25 to 44, 23.1% from 45 to 64, and 20.9% who were 65 years of age or older. The median age was 39 years. For every 100 females, there were 97.8 males. For every 100 females age 18 and over, there were 115.6 males.

The median income for a household in the city was $27,750, and the median income for a family was $30,000. Males had a median income of $25,000 versus $31,250 for females. The per capita income for the city was $14,921. None of the population or the families were below the poverty line.

== Notable person ==
- George R. Wicker, Minnesota legislator
