= Battle of Sugar Point =

1898 battle of the American Indian Wars in Minnesota

- Part of the American Indian Wars
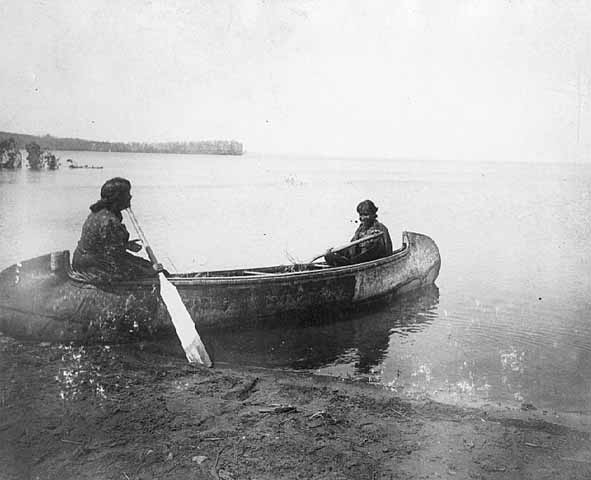
- Ojibways in a canoe on Leech Lake, 1896.
Date	October 5, 1898
Location	Leech Lake, Minnesota
Result	Chippewa victory

Belligerents
Chippewa	United States

Commanders and leaders
Bugonaygeshig	(United States) John M. Bacon (United States) Melville Wilkinson †

Strength
19 warriors	500

Casualties and losses
	7 killed (including 1 Indian policeman shot by mistake); 19 wounded

The Battle of Sugar Point, or the Battle of Leech Lake, was fought on October 5, 1898 between the 3rd U.S. Infantry and members of the Pillager Band of Chippewa Indians in a failed attempt to apprehend Pillager Ojibwe Bugonaygeshig ("Old Bug" or "Hole-In-The-Day"), as the result of a dispute with Indian Service officials on the Leech Lake Reservation in Cass County, Minnesota.

Often referred to as "the last Indian Uprising in the United States", the engagement was also the first battle to be fought in the area of the United States known as the Old Northwest since the Black Hawk War in 1832.

The last Medal of Honor issued during the Indian Wars was awarded to Private Oscar Burkard of the 3rd U.S. Infantry Regiment.

== Background ==
The main issue between the Pillagers and Indian Service officials was the frequent arrest of tribal members on minor charges and transporting them to federal courts far from the reservation for trial. Frequently, these charges involved the sale and consumption of alcohol on the reservation, banned by federal law. Witnesses to criminal acts were also transported.

Harvesting of dead-and-down timber by local logging companies also caused considerable resentment. Although the logging companies paid for the timber they harvested, the value was often underestimated and payments were frequently late. In addition, some unscrupulous loggers purposely set fire to healthy trees in order to damage them and pass them off as dead timber.

A Pillager, Bugonaygeshig, was among those protesting the business practices of the logging companies on the reservation in early 1898. However, when he and Sha-Boon-Day-Shkong traveled to the nearby Indian village of Onigum on September 15, they were seized by U.S. Deputy Marshal Robert Morrison and U.S. Indian Agent Arthur M. Tinker as witnesses to a bootlegging operation and were going to be transported to Duluth (Bugonaygeshig had previously testified at another bootlegging trial in the port city on Lake Superior five months earlier). As the two were being led away, several Pillagers attacked Morrison and Tinker allowing Bugonaygeshig and Sha-Boon-Day-Shkong to escape custody and return to their homes on Sugar Point.

After Bugonaygeshig's escape, Tinker requested military assistance from Fort Snelling. A small force of 20 soldiers from the 3rd Regiment United States Infantry under Lieutenant Chauncey B. Humphreys were dispatched to Onigum. When his scouts reported Bugonaygeshig was refusing to surrender, Humphreys decided to send for additional reinforcements.

A larger force was soon raised and included 77 soldiers under Brevet Major Melville C. Wilkinson who was also accompanied by General John M. Bacon. Others who took part in the expedition included U.S. Marshals and deputy marshals, Indian Police officers and several reporters.

The small force had boarded two small steamships, the Flora and the Chief of Duluth, and sailed from Walker, Minnesota, across Leech Lake until they reached Sugar Point, a small peninsula located in the northeast section of the lake.

== Battle ==
Soon after landing at the village, two of the Pillagers who were involved in Bugonaygeshig's escape were recognized and arrested. Bugonaygeshig himself could not be found, apparently having fled prior to their arrival. The soldiers made camp and began searching the surrounding woods and neighboring villages to arrest any Pillagers with outstanding warrants. None of those with arrest warrants were found and, in fact, there were few male Pillagers found to be present in the area.

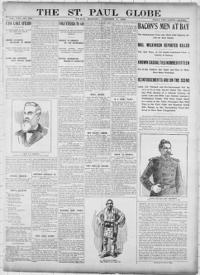
Left to right Capt T.J Sheehan; Bog-Ah-MA-Gesig; Major Wilkinson as it appeared in The St Paul Globe October 7, 1898

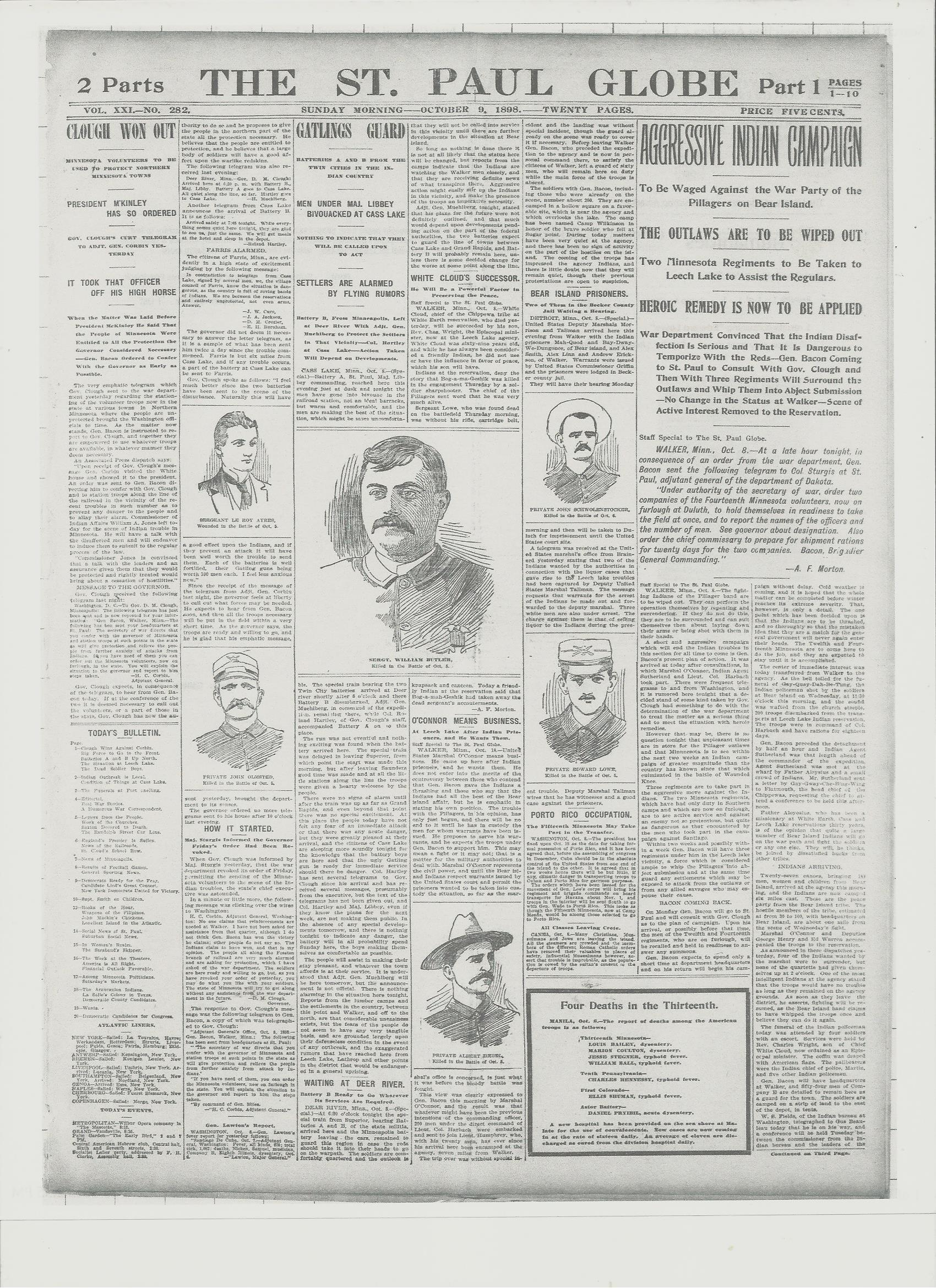
The St Paul Globe October 9, 1898 showing portraits of six of the killed and wounded U.S. Army casualties

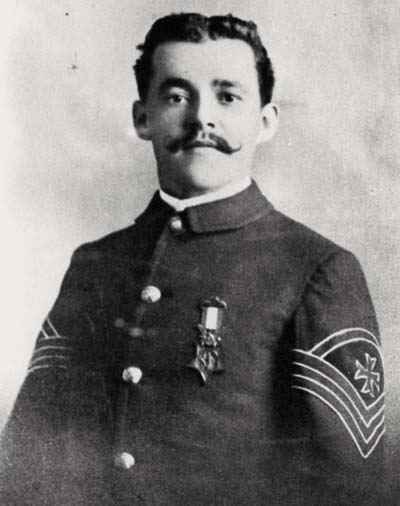
Oscar Burkard

The exact circumstances as to which side fired the first shot are disputed by both sides. General Bacon claimed that one of the soldier's rifles accidentally discharged causing the Pillagers hiding in the woods to think that they were being attacked while the Pillagers said the battle started when several soldiers were seen firing at an Indian canoe carrying several women as their steamship approached Sugar Point.

Around 11:30 am, the Pillagers began firing upon the soldiers from the surrounding woods. The soldiers, many of them young recruits, dropped to the ground although their officers managed to get them to form a crescent-shaped skirmish line around Bugonaygeshig's cabin. During the first half-hour, a number of Wilkinson's men were killed or wounded. After Wilkinson himself was shot in the leg, he and some of the other wounded were moved to the lake side of the cabin which provided some protective cover.

Recovering behind the cabin for only a few moments, Major Wilkinson soon returned outside after his leg was bandaged and began encouraging the young troopers. He was soon shot again, this time through the abdomen, and was carried back into the cabin where he died an hour later. Another man under his command, Sergeant William Butler, was also killed as he went off to inform General Bacon of Major Wilkinson's mortal wound. Gunfire from the Pillagers became less frequent after this point; however, some would take occasional shots throughout the rest of the day.

That evening, an Indian policeman was killed by a soldier who mistook him for one of the Pillagers and, the following morning, a soldier was killed while trying to dig out some potatoes from a garden patch. He was the last official casualty of the battle.

The Pillagers finally dispersed early the next day and the soldiers headed back to Walker. Six soldiers, including Major Wilkinson, had been killed and ten others wounded. None of the civilians had been killed during the battle, with the exception of one Indian Police officer, although five — including a second Indian policeman — had been wounded. After his escape, Bugonaygeshig was never captured.

== Aftermath ==
The initial report of the skirmish sparked a panic and fears of a general uprising and attacks on the nearby settlements of Bemidji, Cass Lake, Deer River, Grand Rapids, and Walker, Minnesota. Additional federal troops were sent from Fort Snelling and the Minnesota National Guard mobilized, while local settlers organized into impromptu militias. For their part, the Ojibwe rapidly dispersed from their villages to remote parts of the reservation, fearing reprisals on the part of the army or settlers. However, public fears of another Indian uprising subsided after newspapers began reporting the circumstances of the attack. The day after the battle, the Cass County Pioneer published a letter from the chiefs of the Pillagers:

We, the undersigned chiefs and headmen of the Pillager band of Chippewa [Ojibwe] Indians of Minnesota... respectfully represent that our people are carrying a heavy burden, and in order that they may not be crushed by it, we humbly petition you to send a commission, consisting of men who are honest and cannot be controlled by lumbermen, to investigate the existing troubles here... We now have only the pine lands of our reservation for our future subsistence and support, but the manner in which we are being defrauded out of these has alarmed us. The lands are now, as heretofore, being underestimated by the appraisers, the pine thereon is being destroyed by fires in order to create the class of timber known as dead or down timber, so as to enable [others] to cut and sell the same for their own benefit.

Several days following the incident, U.S. Commissioner of Indian Affairs William A. Jones negotiated with Pillager leaders in a council held at the Leech Lake Reservation from October 10–15. After the council concluded, Commissioner Jones criticized local and state officials for "the frequent arrests of Indians on trivial causes, often for no cause at all, taking them down to Duluth and Minneapolis for trial, two hundred miles away from their agency, and then turning them adrift without means to return home". Jones later said in a report to the Secretary of the Interior Cornelius Newton Bliss,

The Indians were prompted to their outbreak by the wrongs committed against them and chafed under unfair treatment. They now will go back to their homes and live peaceably if the whites will treat them fairly, which is very likely, as the whites were thoroughly impressed with the stand taken by the Indians. In this respect the outbreak has taught them a lesson.

The last survivor of the battle, Emma Bear, died at Cass Lake in Cass County, Minnesota, on July 13, 2001, at the age of 103. She was eight months old at the time of the battle. Her father, Bear (Makwa), and George White, attempted to negotiate a truce with the soldiers but were two of those arrested prior to the battle.

Among the injured survivors were: E. E. Antonello, Richard Boucher, Edward Brown, John Daily, Chas. Francis, Private Godfrey, Charles Jensen, Albert Schuyler, Charles Turner, George R. Wicker, Edward Harris (city marshal of Walker), Joseph Orcar (pilot of steamer Jennie), T. J. Sheenan (deputy U.S. Marshall), Tinker (Indian inspector), Henry Waters (engineer of the Jennie).

The battle is the subject of Ojibwe writer Gerald Vizenor's long poem Bear Island: The War at Sugar Point (University of Minnesota Press, 2006).
