= Chemawa Indian School =

Public school in Salem, Oregon, U.S.

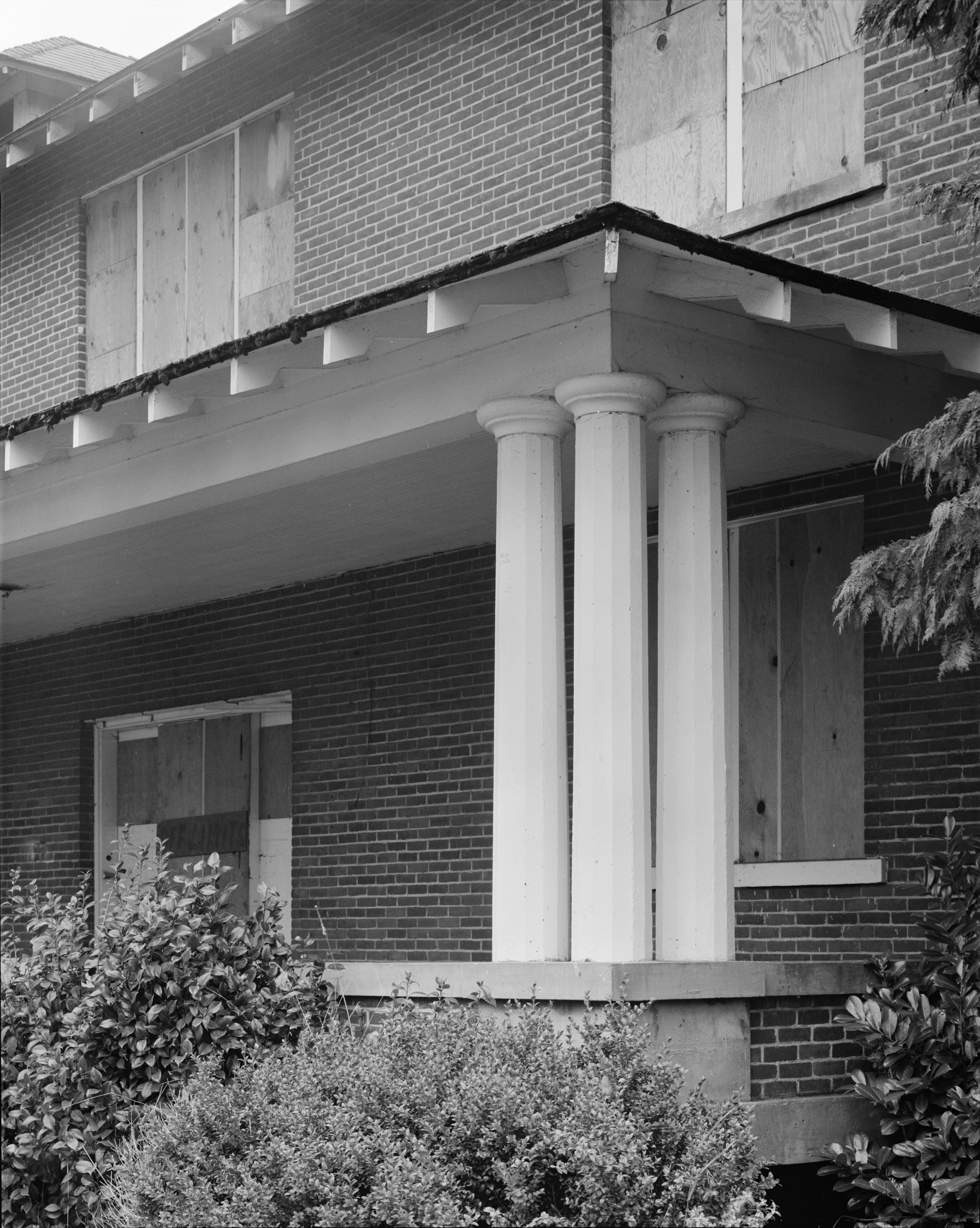
- Hawley Hall porch

Location
- 3700 Chemawa Road NE; Salem, Marion County, Oregon 97305; United States; 45.00004°N 122.984712°W

Information
- Type: Public
- Opened: 1880
- Authority: Bureau of Indian Affairs
- Superintendent: Don Tomlin
- Principal: Amanda Ward
- Grades: 9-12
- Enrollment: 425
- Colors: Red, white, and black
- Athletics conference: OSAA PacWest Conference 3A-3
- Mascot: Brave
- Rival: Willamette Valley Christian School
- Accreditation: NAAS
- Website: cis.bie.edu
- Chemawa Indian School Site
- U.S. National Register of Historic Places
- Area: 86 acres (35 ha)
- Built: 1885
- Architectural style: Colonial Revival, Bungalow/Craftsman, Georgian Revival
- NRHP reference No.: 92001333
- Added to NRHP: December 16, 1992

Chemawa Indian School (pronounced: "shih-MAH-wuh", /tʃɪˈmɑːwə/) is a Native American boarding school in Salem, Oregon, United States. Named after the Chemawa band of the Kalapuya people of the Willamette Valley, it opened on February 25, 1880 as an elementary school. Grades were added and dropped, and it became a fully accredited high school in 1927, when lower grades were dropped.

The second Indian boarding school to be established, Chemawa Indian School is the oldest continuously operating Native American boarding school in the United States. Its graduates number in the thousands. At its peak of enrollment in 1926, it had 1,000 students. New buildings were constructed in the 1970s on a campus near the original one, where at one time 70 buildings stood, including barns and other buildings related to the agricultural programs.

During the 2023–24 academic year, it continued to serve students in the ninth through twelfth grades. It has primarily served students of tribes from the Pacific Northwest and Alaska.

Former names of the school include Forest Grove Indian Industrial Training School, United States Indian Training and Normal School, Salem Indian Industrial Training School, and Harrison Institute.

== History ==
=== Establishment ===
The Chemawa Indian School was a product of the ideas of the 1870s, when the American government sought to end its ongoing conflict with the Native American population through cultural assimilation. Following the ideas of military officer Richard Henry Pratt and the perceived successful establishment of the Carlisle Indian School near Harrisburg, Pennsylvania, funding was provided for a boarding school for American Indian children in the American Pacific Northwest.

Complete campus of the Forest Grove Indian Industrial Training School shortly after the time of its establishment in 1880. Facing West, boys' dorm on the left, girls' dorm on the right, workshop center.

In contrast to earlier belief that Native Americans were inherently "uncivilizable", Pratt argued for immersive education as a mechanism to assimilate and integrate the various pre-Columbian peoples into modern society. Schools established under Pratt's influence were deliberately located far from Indian reservations as a means of isolating students from traditional cultural folkways.

An initial site was developed on four acres of land near Forest Grove, Oregon with a budget of $5,000 appropriated. With Indian affairs part of the bailiwick of the War Department, US Army Lieutenant Melville Wilkinson, secretary to General Oliver Otis Howard, was tapped to lead the project. Wilkinson, with the help of eight Puyallup Indian youths, began construction on first campus buildings in 1880.

The first class enrolled at the Forest Grove Indian Industrial Training School consisted of 14 boys and 4 girls from Washington state, 17 of the Puyallup nation and one Nisqually boy. Curriculum was determined by gender, with boys taught painting, baking, drafting, machining, masonry, blacksmithing, shoemaking, and carpentry — artisan skills considered important for successful rural life. Girls were steered towards mastery of the "domestic arts".

According to an analysis of demographic records by Pacific University archivist Richard Read, during its five years of existence the Forest Grove Indian School came from more than 40 tribal groups, totaling 382 students. Of these, more than half came from the Puyallup (58), Nez Perce (50), Wasco (46), Spokane (20), Umatilla (20), and Klamath (19) tribes.

=== New location ===
Owing to poor drainage, an inadequate inventory of land for agricultural education, and spurred by the 1884 destruction by fire of the girls' dormitory, officials began to investigate an alternative site for the school elsewhere in Oregon's Willamette Valley. Three sites were proposed, including a 100-acre parcel of heavily timbered land near Newberg, a 23-acre site near Forest Grove, Oregon with 75 more acres of pasture land located a few miles away, and 171 acres of partially cleared timber land five miles north of Salem. The Salem site was selected owing to its proximity to state government and the location's favorable inventory of land.

Construction at the Salem site began in 1885. Initial temporary wooden buildings were later razed to make way for more permanent brick structures. On June 1, 1885, the Chemawa Indian School was opened with approximately half of the students moving to the new location and half staying behind in Forest Grove owing to lack of space at the new facility. On October 1, 1885, John Lee was named superintendent of the new "Salem Indian Training School". Construction of three new buildings was shortly completed at the Salem campus and after a winter of separation the remaining students from Forest Grove were moved to Salem.

The first graduating class completed the sixth grade in 1886. Courses were subsequently added expanding education through the tenth grade.

With an expanded land inventory, increased attention was paid to agricultural training, including dairy farming, animal husbandry, and crop farming, the byproduct of which provided food for later use.

=== The assimilationist mission ===
A 1902 application for Chemawa, on which the applicant made a promise "to abide by the rules and regulations of the school" — blindly signing off on forced assimilation.

A circular letter sent to superintendents of off-reservation schools such as Chemawa by Commissioner of Indian Affairs William A. Jones in 1902 illuminates the assimilationist goals of the boarding schools. After receiving signed permission from parents, guardian, or next-of kin, "sound and healthy" children with "the requisite amount of Indian blood" were to be enrolled for a period of not less than three years — and if possible for terms of four or five years.

The school was to retain control over the child for the whole of that time, and "no promises must be made to any parents or others that the pupils enrolled will be returned home during vacation without special permission of this office, and full data must be submitted with your request showing the necessity for such return."

"White Indians" — that is, "children showing one-eighth or less Indian blood, whose parents do not live on an Indian reservations, whose home is among white people, where there are churches and schools, who are presumed to have adopted the white man's manners and customs, and are to all intents and purposes white people, are debarred from enrollment in the government non-reservation and reservation schools," Jones declared.

=== Period of growth ===
The Superintendent's "cottage" — actually a comfortable two-story home with a large front porch — was built in 1885. Wooden structures for living areas and workspaces were gradually replaced by larger and better permanent brick structures as government funding was approved.

The school's hospital was built in 1890, with a second story added in 1900. The wooden structure was centrally located and surrounded by a lawn and flowers. Each ward of the hospital had a bath toilet, and washrooms, with spacious and airy porches all the way around.

Chemawa's permanent main school building was a steam-heated and fully electrified structure built in 1899 at a cost of $15,000. The brick building had 10 classrooms and an office, a book room, and a large assembly hall with a capacity of about 600.

A large two-story brick industrial trades building was constructed in 1902. Sections of the facility were dedicated to tailors and dressmakers, a carpentry shop, as well as areas for harnessmaking, shoemaking, and wagonmaking. A blacksmith shop, bakery, and a print shop were located elsewhere on the grounds.

The school also offered training and practical experience in farming, gardening, orchard work, and dairy farming. The school had 30 acres of orchard, of which 15 were committed to prunes, 5 acres of apples, cherries, and pears, and 10 acres of small fruit, including 4 acres blackberries, raspberries, gooseberries, and 6 acres of strawberries.

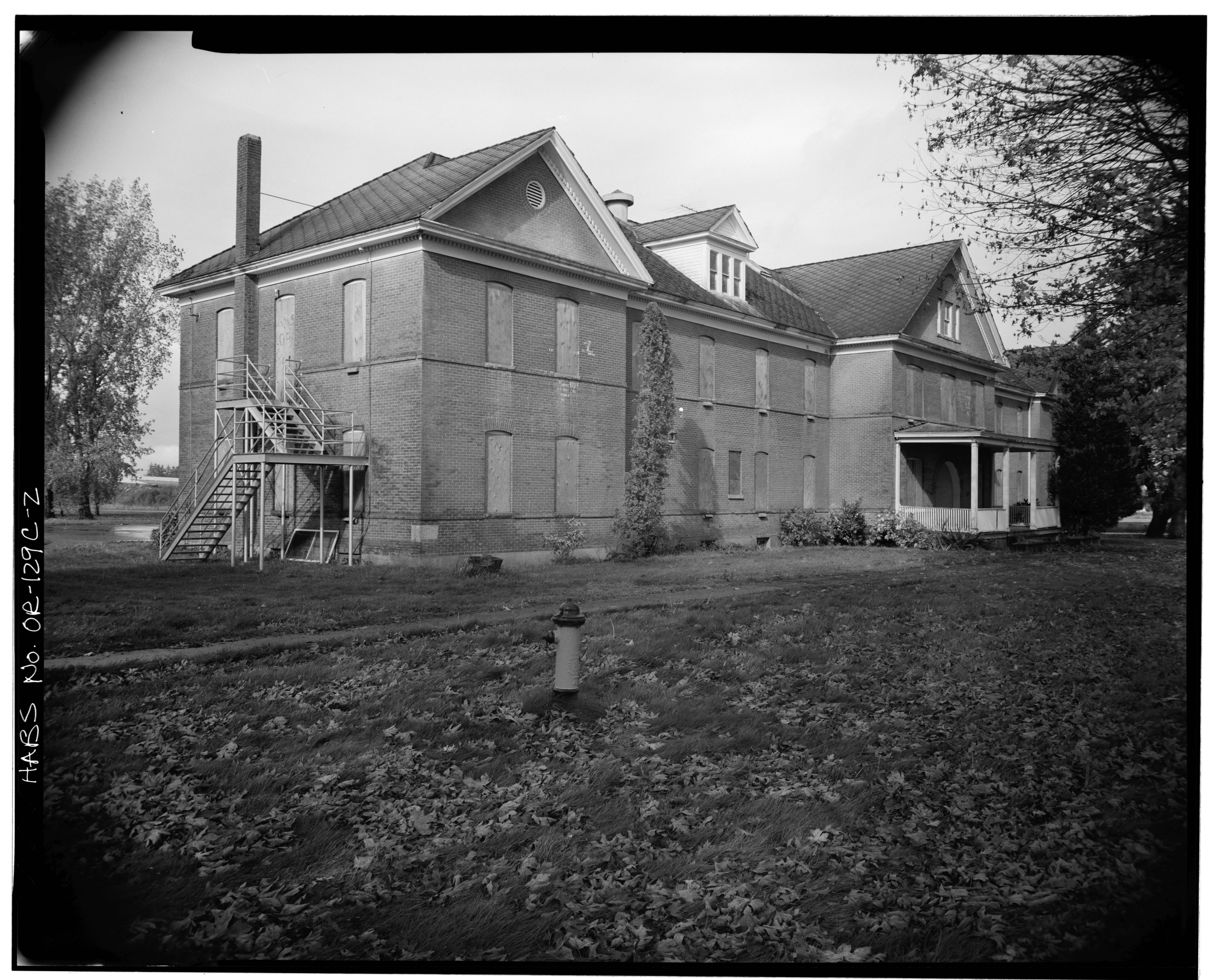
McBride Hall, completed in 1902, was the dormitory for "large girls". It was demolished in the 1970s.

McBride Hall, the permanent girls' dormitory, was built in 1902 at a cost of $20,000. It was steam heated, fully electrified, and well ventilated. It was designed to accommodate 150 "large girls". "Small" and "medium" girls were housed in a separate facility.

A new "large boys home" was approved by congress in 1902 and $25,000 appropriated "for construction of a new brick dormitory suitable for the accommodation of two hundred and fifty boys."

By 1922, the Chemawa campus had 70 buildings, mostly of wood-frame construction but others made of brick. Acquisition of adjacent land brought the total area held by the school to 426 acres (1.72 km^{2}).

=== Athletics and cultural activities ===
1903 Chemawa football team.

Chemawa also had cultural activity organizations similar to most large schools of the era, including a 30-member choir and a 25-member band. The band was not part of the regular school program of instruction but rather met for practice before or after school, four times a week. The school also conducted military drill and parade activities.

A school library provided reading material. Students could participate in sports of basketball, baseball, and football, competing against Anglo high schools and colleges of the region.

=== Demographics ===
According to 1900 census data, there were 220,544 Indians throughout the United States, with another 58,806 living integrated into broader society as ordinary taxpayers. Included in these figures, there were a total of 4,196 Native American births in 1900. Chemawa had 453 students that same year.

By 1913 there were 690 students enrolled, including 175 Alaskan Inuit children.

In February 1915, a reporter for the Portland Oregonian visited Chemawa to document daily life at the school. He found 643 pupils (372 boys, 271 girls) at the time of his visit, with the school being operated by a staff of 51 — of whom 13 were themselves Native American. This mix of Anglo and Native American employees at Chemawa was not unusual, with official statistics from a decade earlier indicating that more than a quarter of the 2,209 employees of the Bureau of Indian Affairs' school service were Indian.

The school was regarded at that time as one of the "Big Six" off-reservation Indian Training Schools operated by the federal government, joining the Carlisle Indian Industrial School in Pennsylvania; the Haskell Institute in Lawrence, Kansas; the Phoenix Indian School in Arizona; the Chilocco Indian Agricultural School in Oklahoma, and Perris Indian School in Riverside, California.

According to the testimony of the 1915 Oregonian journalist, pupils at Chemawa ranged in age from 6 to 26, and included 174 "full Indians", 82 with 3 of their 4 grandparents Native Americans, 209 with half Indian parentage, as well as 157 with one-quarter and 21 with one-eighth "blood". The reporter was told that students represented 106 tribal groups, with about one-third of the student body hailing from the territory of Alaska.

Peak enrollment at Chemawa came in 1926, when the school counted nearly 1,000 students.

Curriculum was expanded to include the 11th and 12th grades were added to the curriculum with all grades below 6th were dropped and in 1927, Chemawa became a fully accredited high school.

=== Depression era through the 1950s ===
The school was threatened with closure in the early 1930s, as the government sought economies during the Great Depression. Interested journalists and Oregon's delegation to the U.S. Congress lobbied with the US Bureau of Indian Affairs to keep it open, and it continued with 300 students.

Lawney Reyes, who attended the school in 1940–1942 (as did his sister, Luana Reyes), devotes two chapters of his memoir White Grizzly Bear's Legacy: Learning to be Indian to his experiences there. He wrote that his consciousness of being "Indian" was largely formed through his conversations with other students.

He also wrote:

"I did not experience any harsh restraint against Indian culture or tradition at Chemewa. Generations of Indians before me had already felt the full force of that practice. I learned that in earlier years, speaking the Indian language (sic.) had been forbidden. White authority had dealt harshly with Indian dancing, singing, and drumming. Students were not allowed to braid their hair or wear any ornaments with Indian design motifs. During my time, efforts to teach the white way were still in force, but attempts to abolish or restrain Indian culture were past. The practice of Indian culture, however, was not encouraged or discussed."

During the 1940s and 1950s a special program for Navajo students was initiated and efforts made to attract Pacific Northwest students, including those from Alaska.

== Chemawa today ==
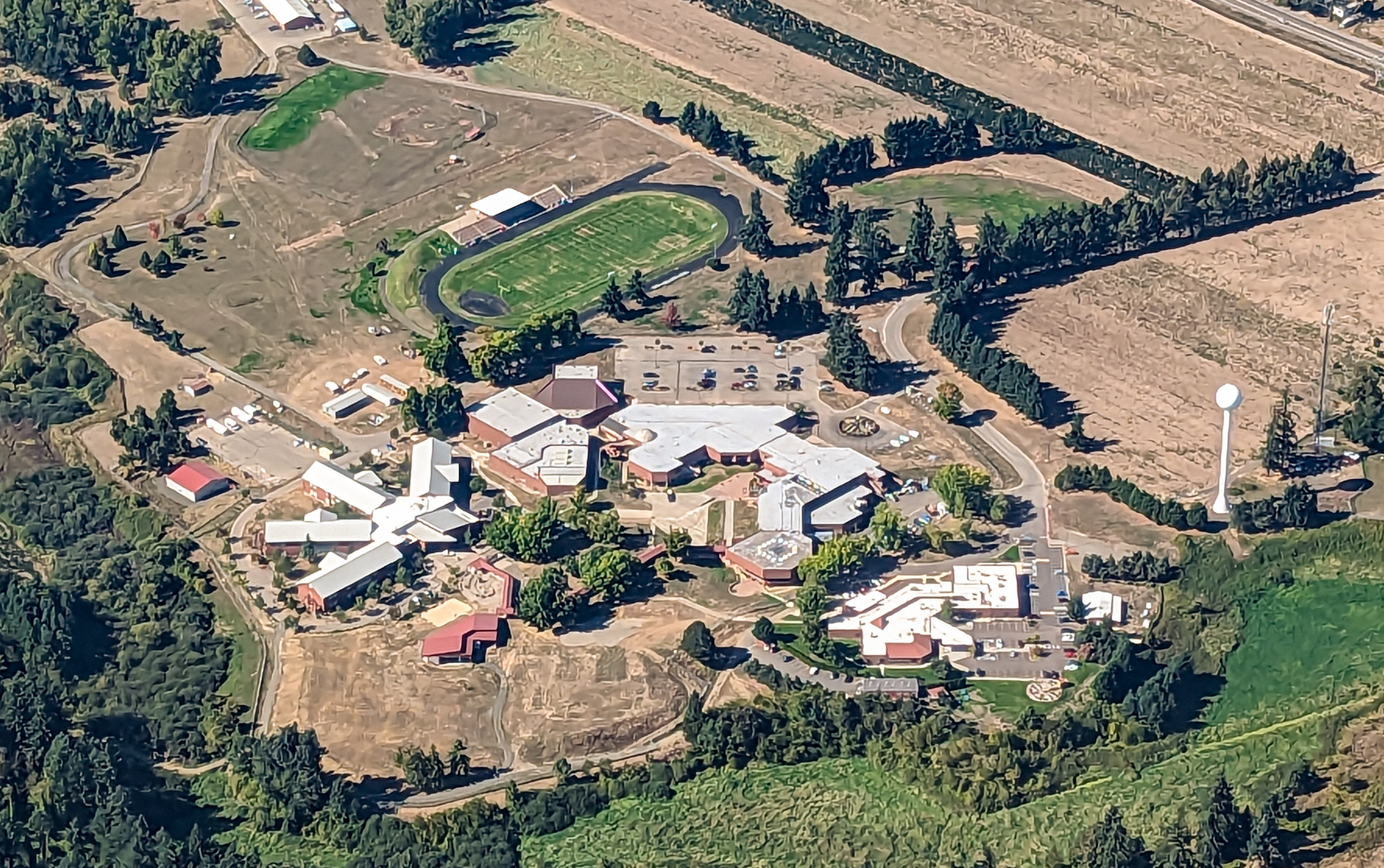
Aerial photo of the school in 2023

In the late 1970s, Chemawa moved to a new campus on adjacent land, with most of the original brick buildings destroyed after the shift. By 2017 the new campus was fenced.

Chemawa today is an alternative high school, accredited through Northwest Association of Accredited Schools since 1971.

=== Student body ===
Circa 1988, 50% of the students in one year were not enrolled in the next and its students frequently moved between various educational systems.

=== Partnership with Willamette University ===
In 2005, Chemawa Indian School formed a partnership with Willamette University, a private liberal arts college in Salem. Willamette undergraduates, along with Chemawa peer tutors, provide tutoring to students four nights per week on the Chemawa campus.

=== Athletics ===
Chemawa School athletic teams compete in the OSAA 2A-2 Tri-River Conference. The school won Oregon state championships in cross country running in 1964, 1972, 1981, and 1986. The school was also state champions for its size class in football in 1914 and 1944.

== National Register of Historic Places ==
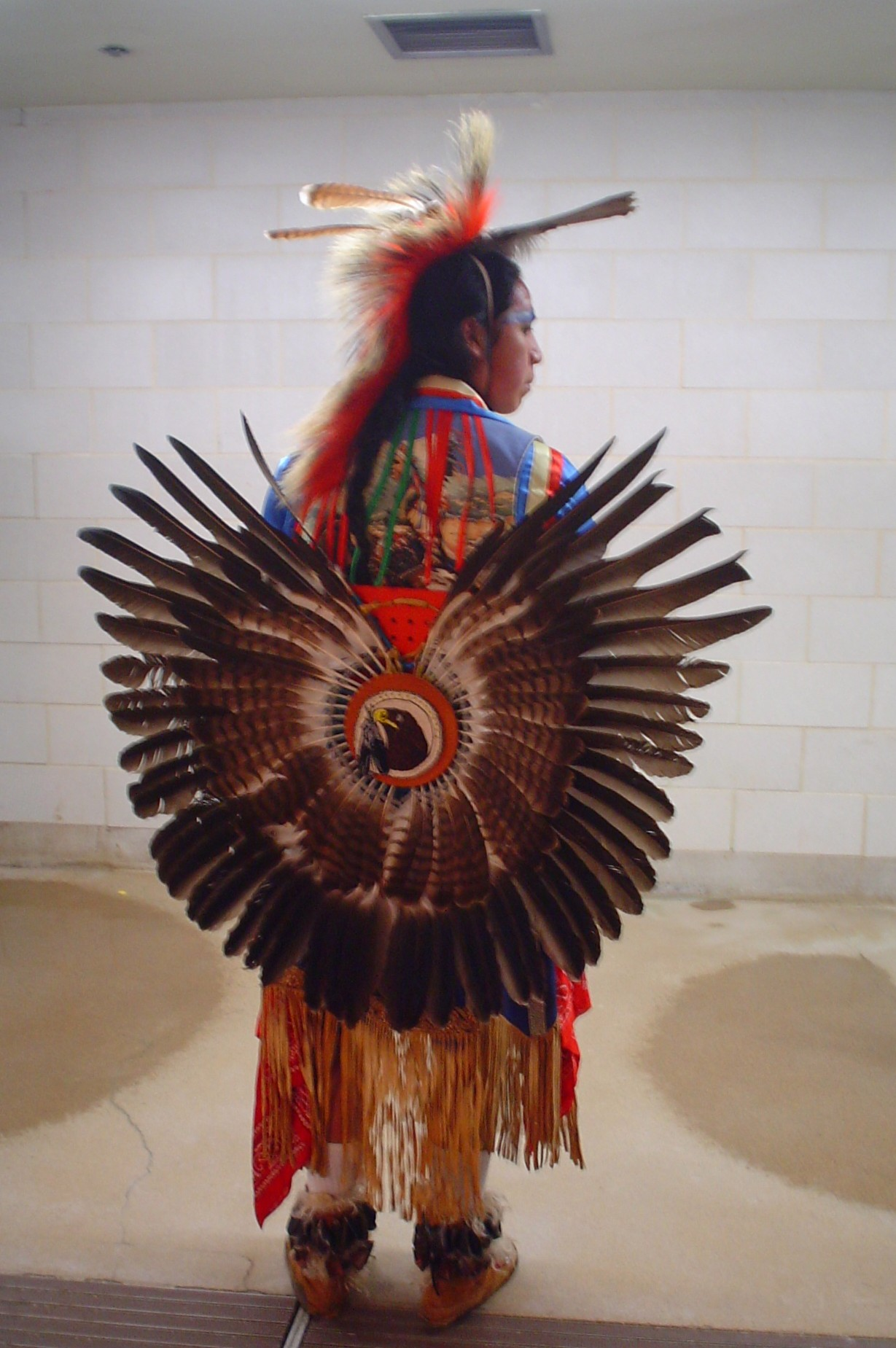
Dancer in traditional regalia attends a pow-wow at Chemawa Indian School.

In 1992 the school's Colonial Revival-style hospital and four other early structures were listed on the National Register of Historic Places (NRHP) as the Chemawa Indian School Site. These buildings were surviving brick structures on the school's "old campus"; the older buildings were demolished after the school moved to the adjacent "new campus" in the late 1970s. The Chemawa Cemetery is the only part of the old campus still intact.

=== Cemetery and unmarked graves ===
Children at such boarding schools often suffered from epidemics in the dormitories of infectious diseases such as tuberculosis (incurable in the early 20th century), influenza and trachoma. As was the case for most residential Indian schools, Chemawa initially maintained a cemetery for students who died during their time at the school. No longer used for student burials after 1940, the cemetery was razed in 1960, with an incomplete set of grave markers later replaced based on school records.

In 2016, numerous unmarked graves of students were reported to have been found at the Chemawa Indian School Cemetery. Marsha Small, a graduate student at Montana State University, used ground-penetrating radar to scan the grounds, locating hundreds of potential unmarked graves by comparing data to the 200 documented grave sites. Small published her findings in her thesis, A Voice for the Children of Chemawa Cemetery (2015). She is concerned with raising public awareness about the graves and in protecting the cemetery from potential damage from a freeway interchange planned nearby.

=== 2003 student death ===
Operations at the Chemawa Indian School were investigated following the death in December 2003 of a 16-year-old student from Warm Springs, Oregon. She died of alcohol poisoning after being locked in a detention cell after being found intoxicated on school grounds. The Inspector General of the U.S. Department of the Interior, together with the U.S. Attorney's office in Portland, Oregon investigated the incident. They found officials at fault.

This and other incidents at reservation detention facilities nationwide were the subject of hearings in June 2004 before the Indian Affairs Committee of the U.S. Senate. The Inspector General of the Department of the Interior noted poor conditions in BIA facilities, the lack of suitable BIA detention facilities for juveniles, high rates of suicide in existing facilities, and failure to report deaths as required, among other problems. He noted that facilities run by the tribes were often in better condition despite similar funding problems and understaffing.

== Notable alumni ==
- Spade Cooley - bandleader, "King of Western Swing"
- Frank LaPena - Nomtipom-Wintu American Indian painter, printmaker, ethnographer, professor, ceremonial dancer, poet, and writer.
- Bob Greene - Makah elder and veteran of World War II
- Pearl Warren - Makah community organizer in Seattle
- Vi Hilbert - Author and teacher, Upper Skagit elder and conservationist of her traditional culture and of the Lushootseed language

== See also ==
- American Indian outing programs

== School publications ==
- Kalama and Lear, The Indian Citizen, vol. 1, no. 1. Forest Grove, OR: Forest Grove Indian Industrial School, February 1884.
- H.L. Lovelace (manager), The Weekly Chemawa American. Chemawa, OR: Chemawa Indian School. Vol. 4 (1901). |

== Image gallery ==
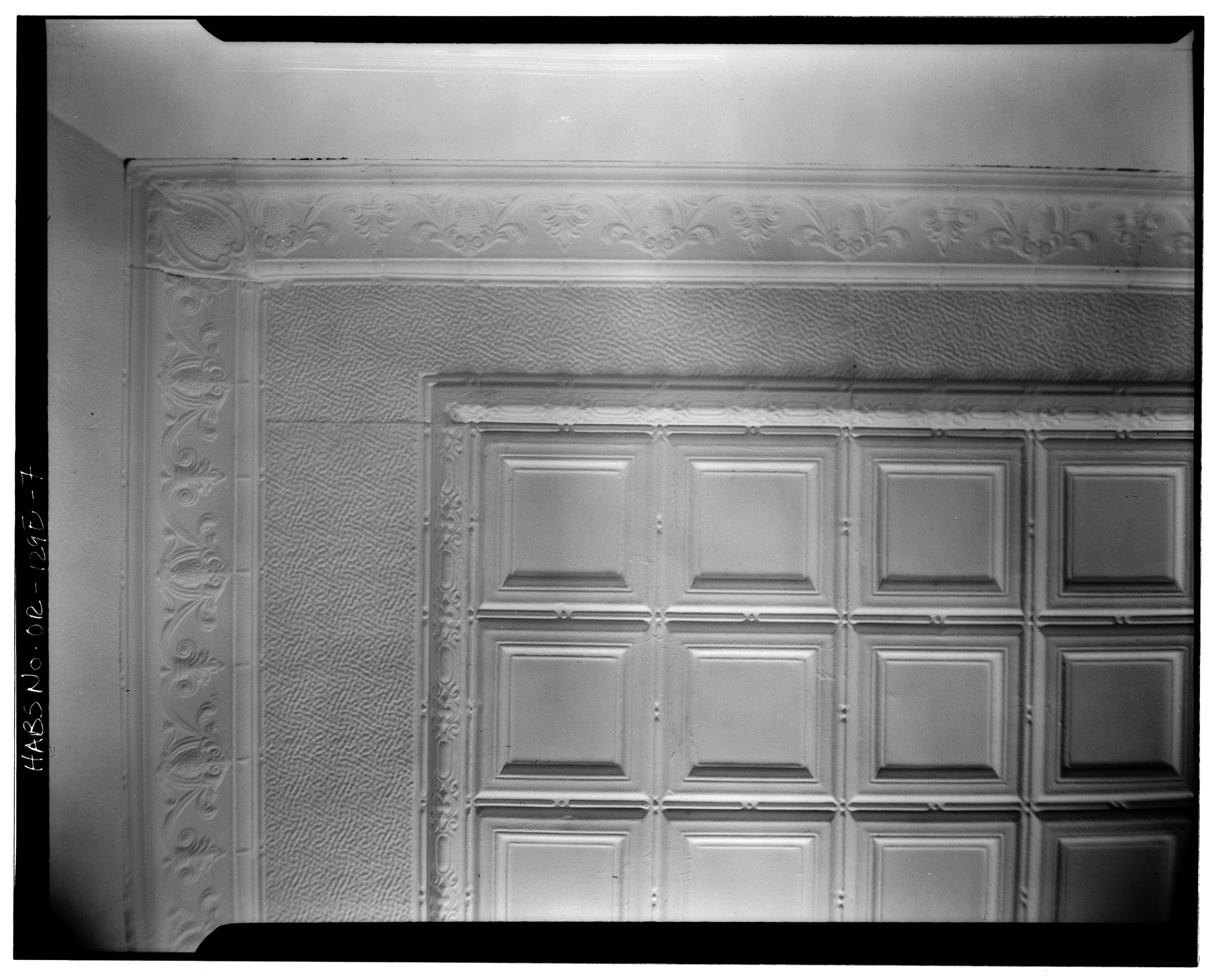
Detail of ceiling

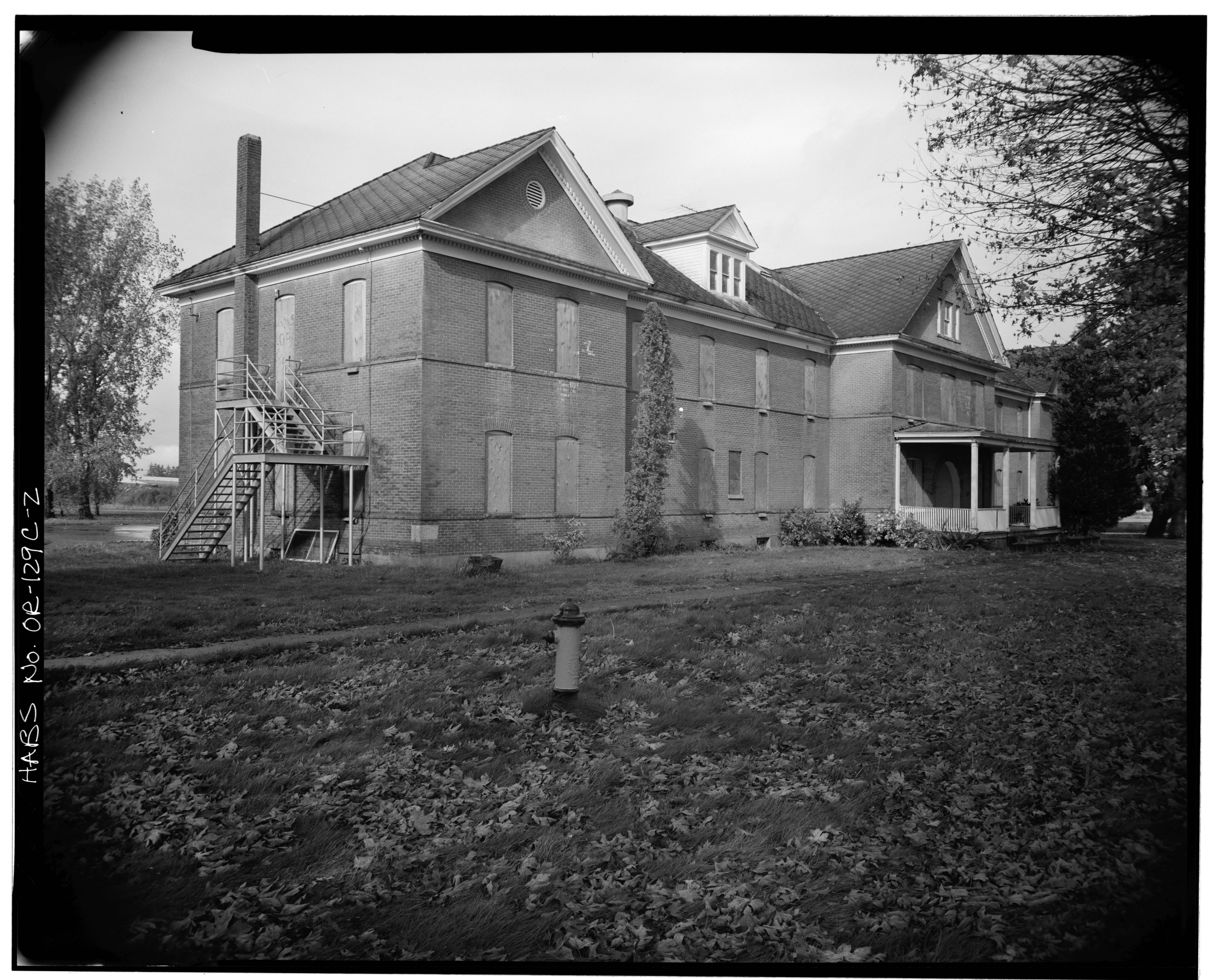
Chugath Street McBride Hall (demolished) - view from southeast - 1977

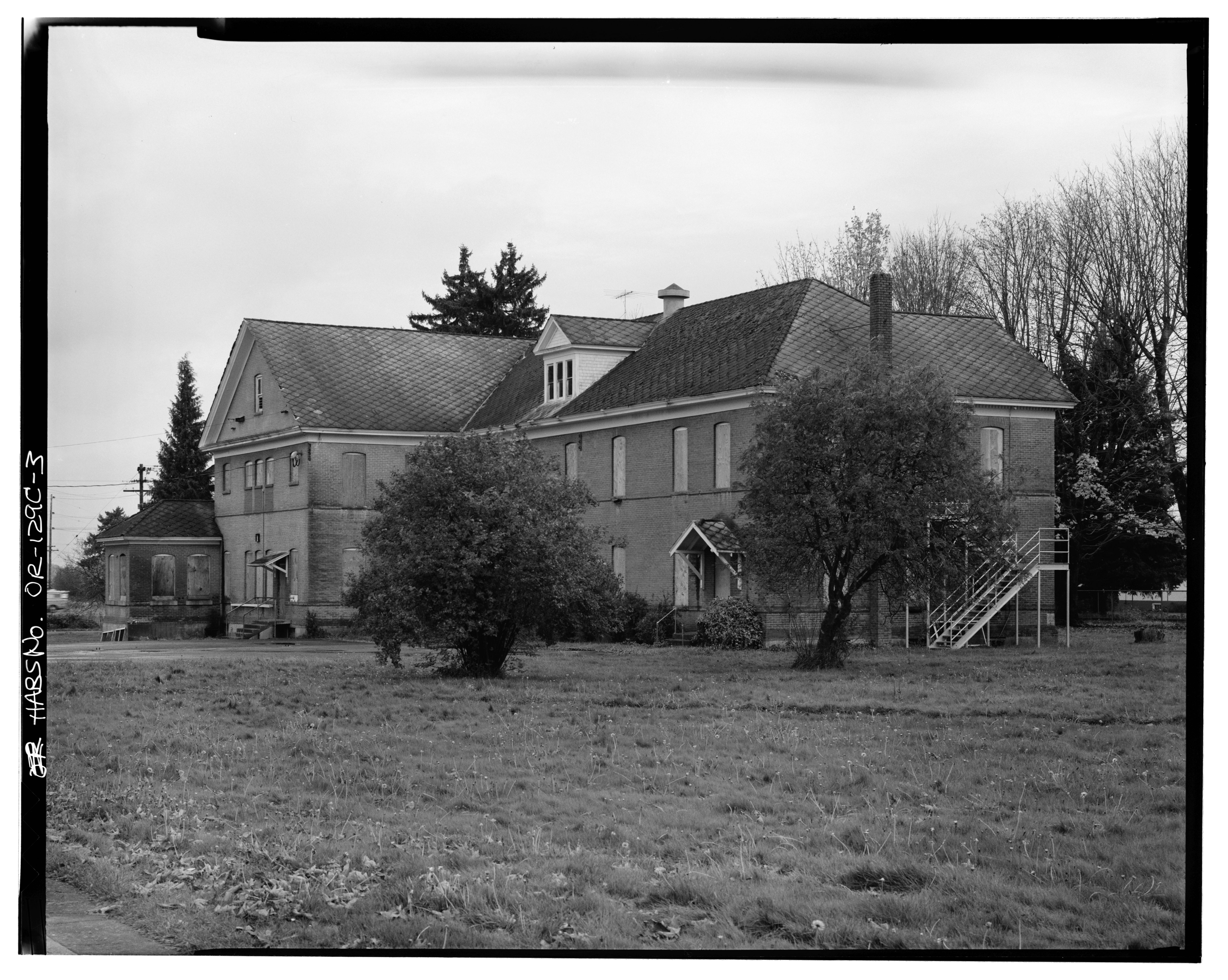
Chugath Street McBride Hall - view from southwest - 1977

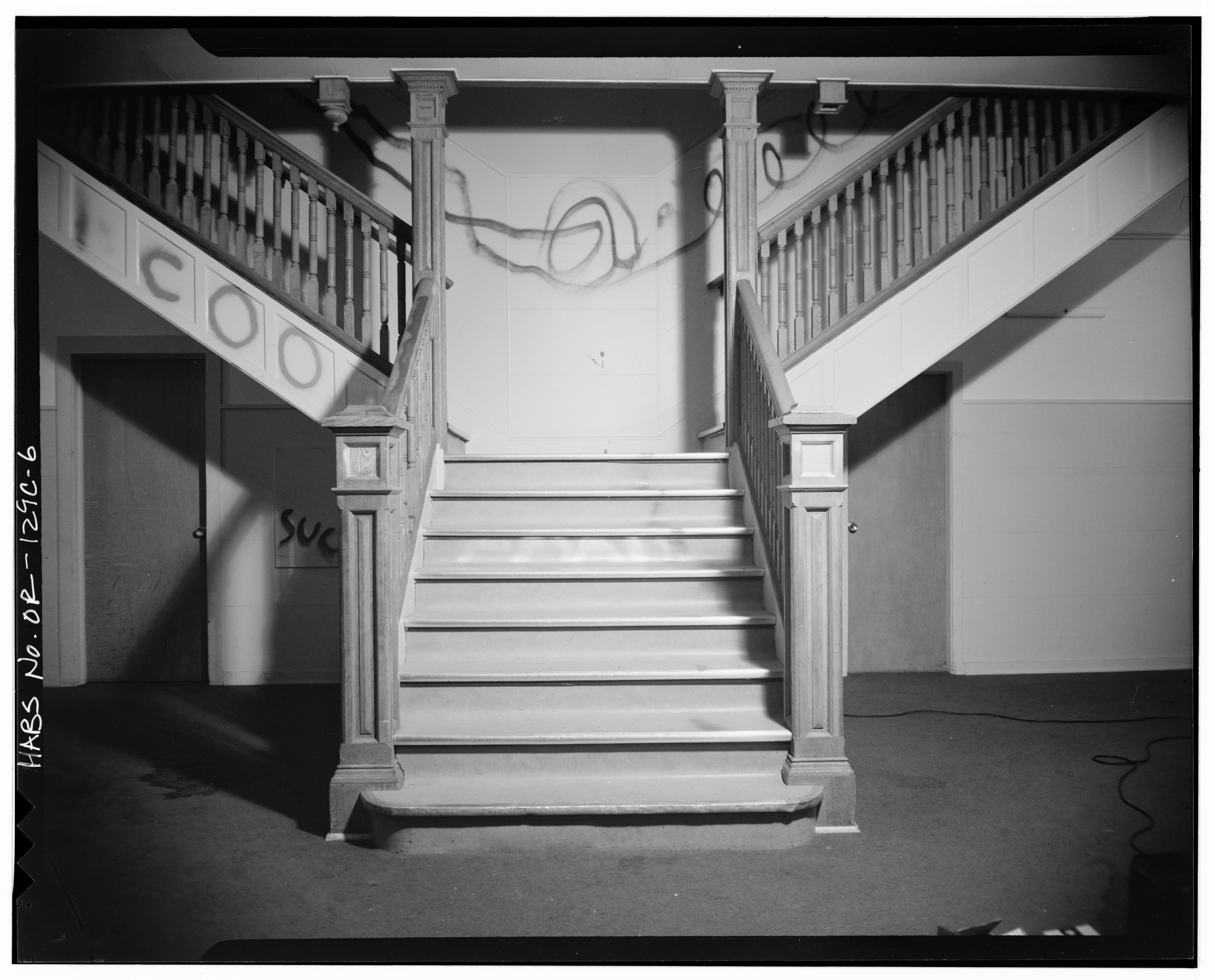
Inside stairway of McBride Hall

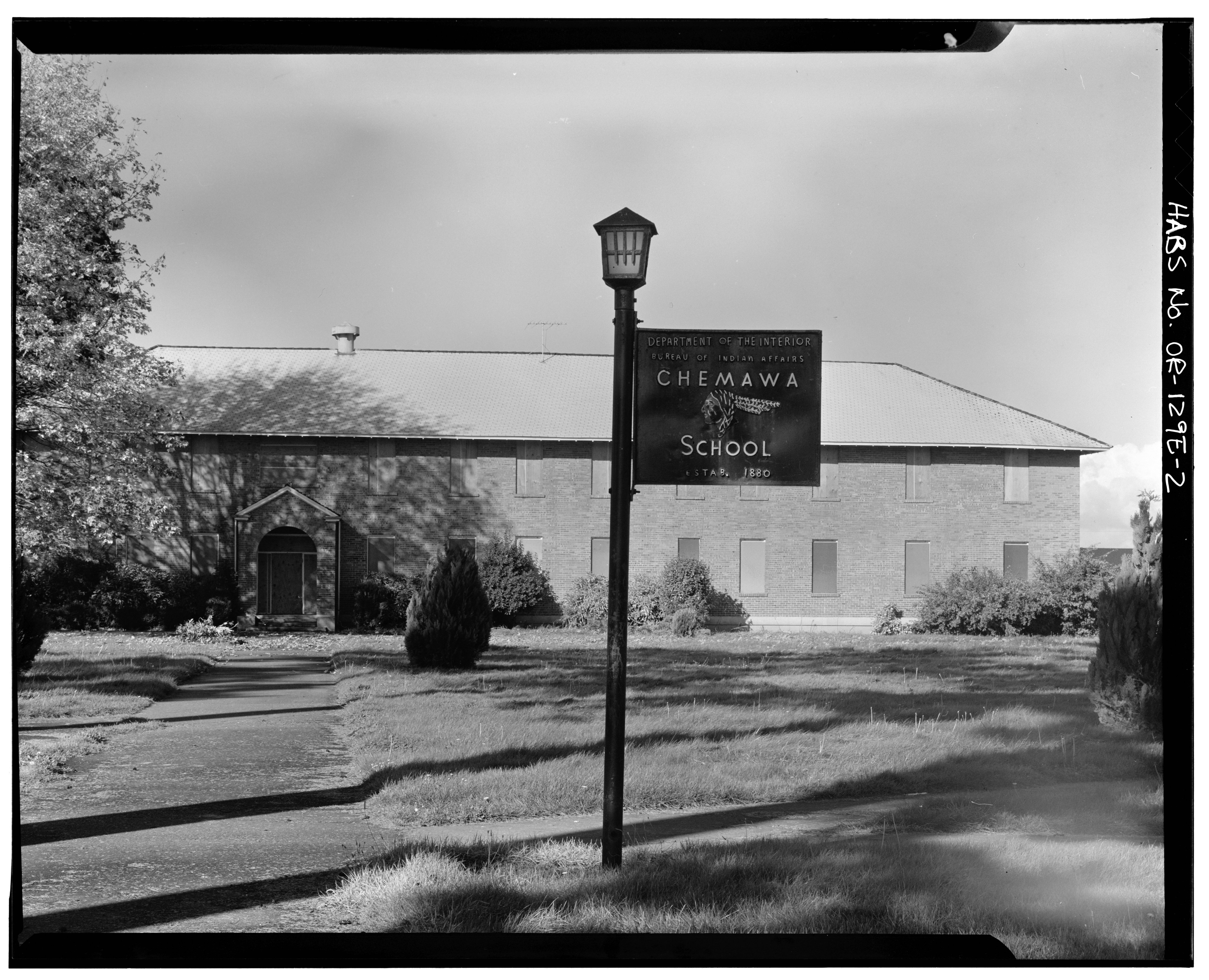
Chugath Street Winona Hall - detail view of east front elevation - 1977

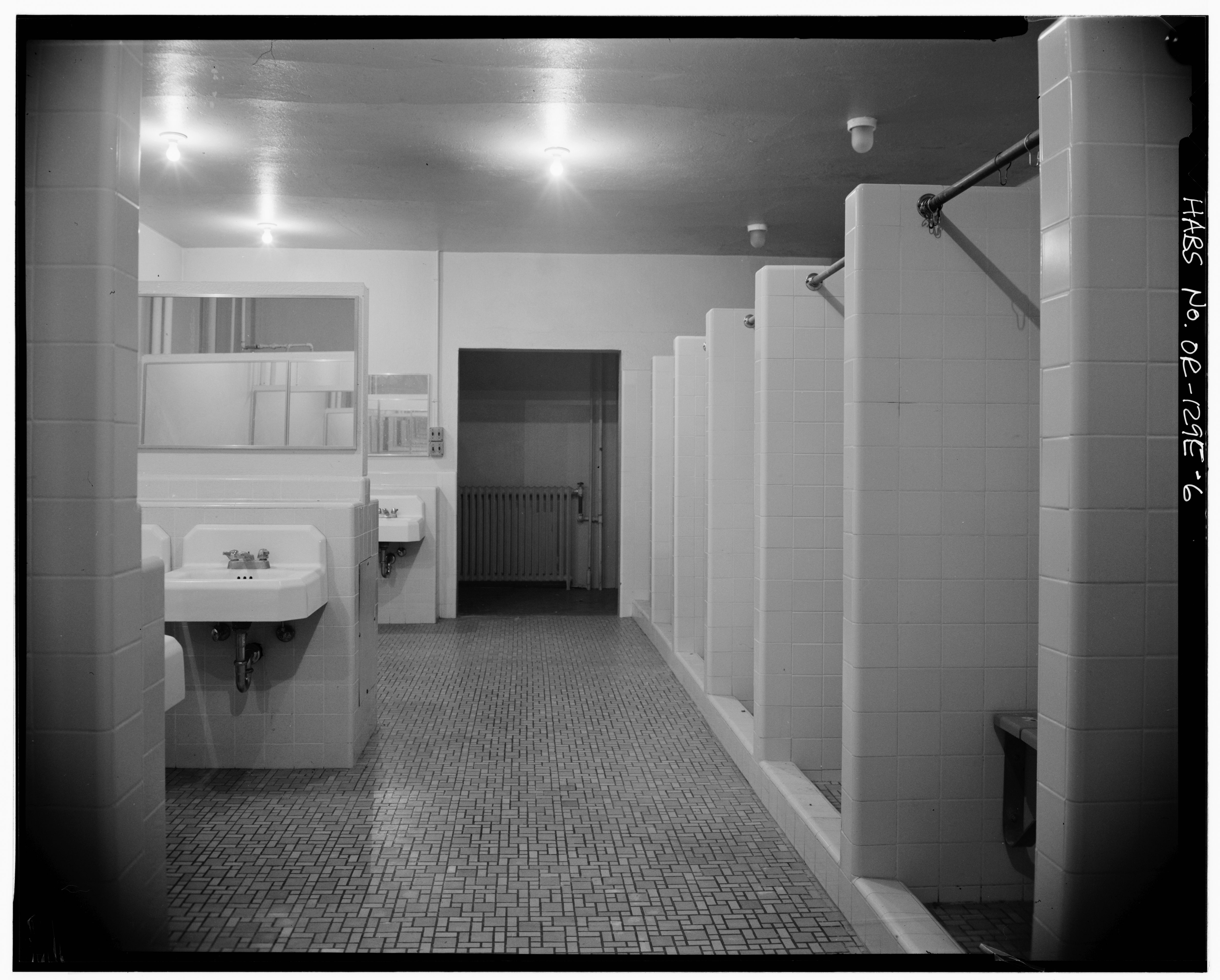
Winona Hall - bathroom - 1977

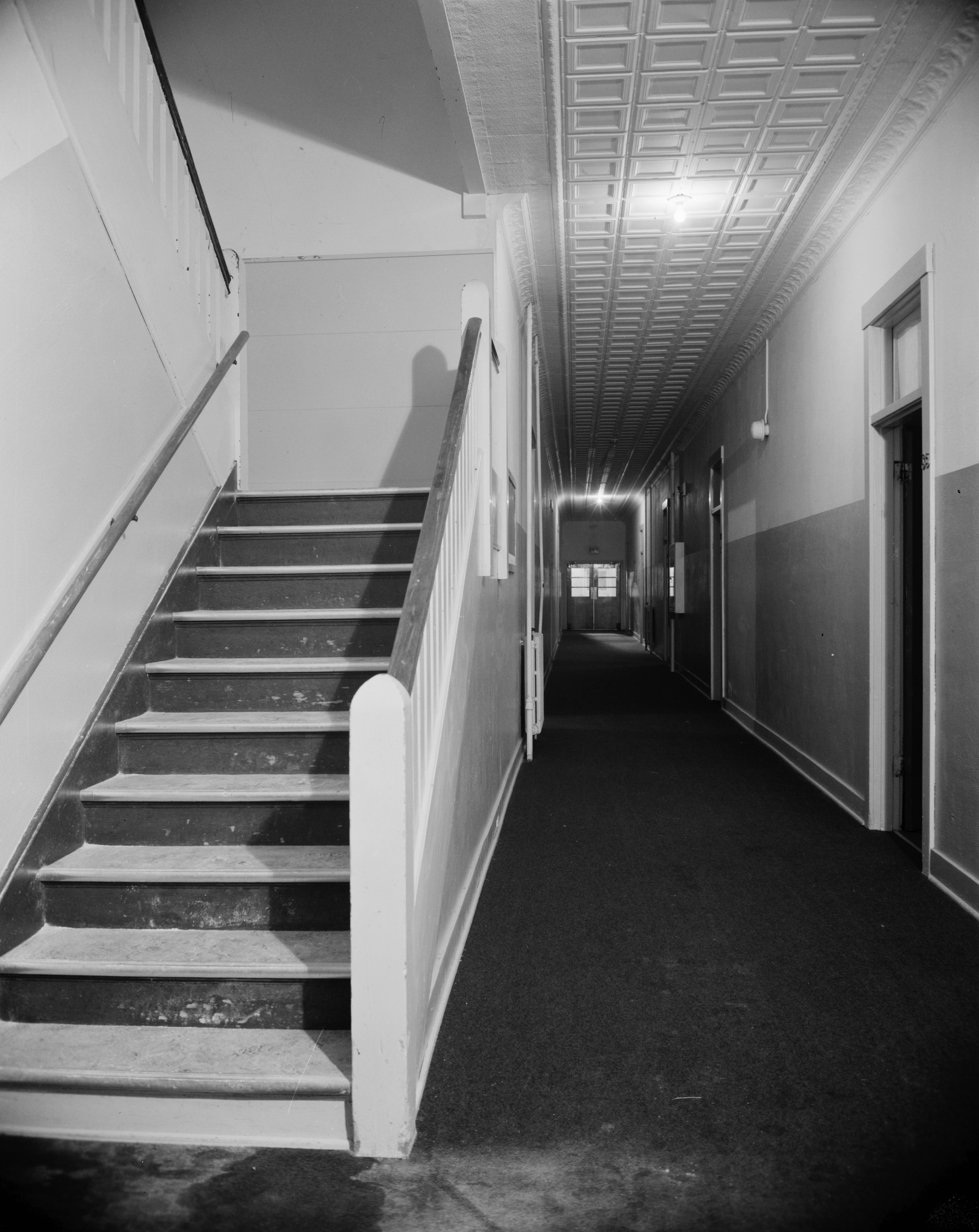
Chugath Street Winona Hall - hall and stair - 1977

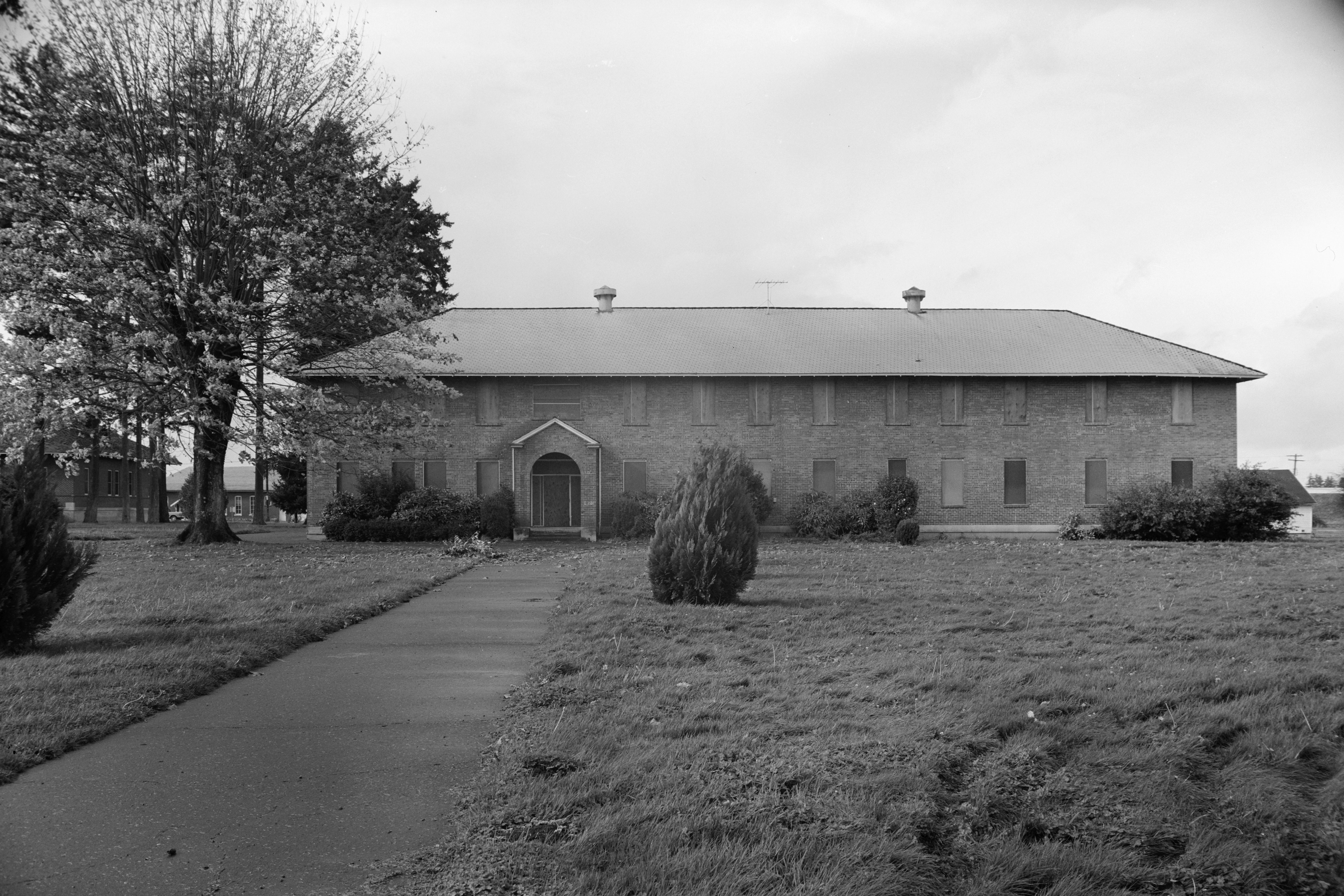
Chugath Street Winona Hall - general view of east front elevation -1977

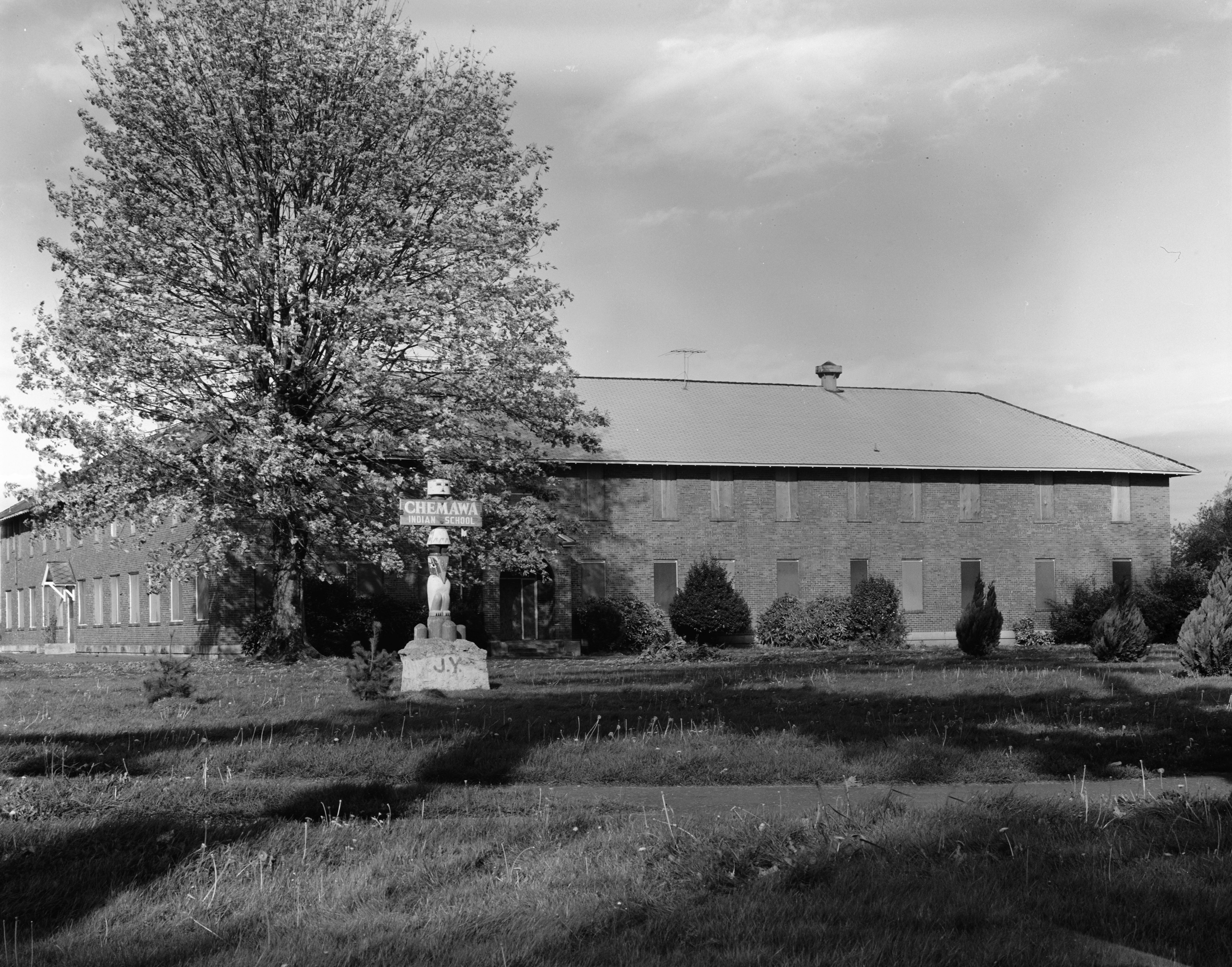
Chugath Street Winona Hall - view from southeast - 1977

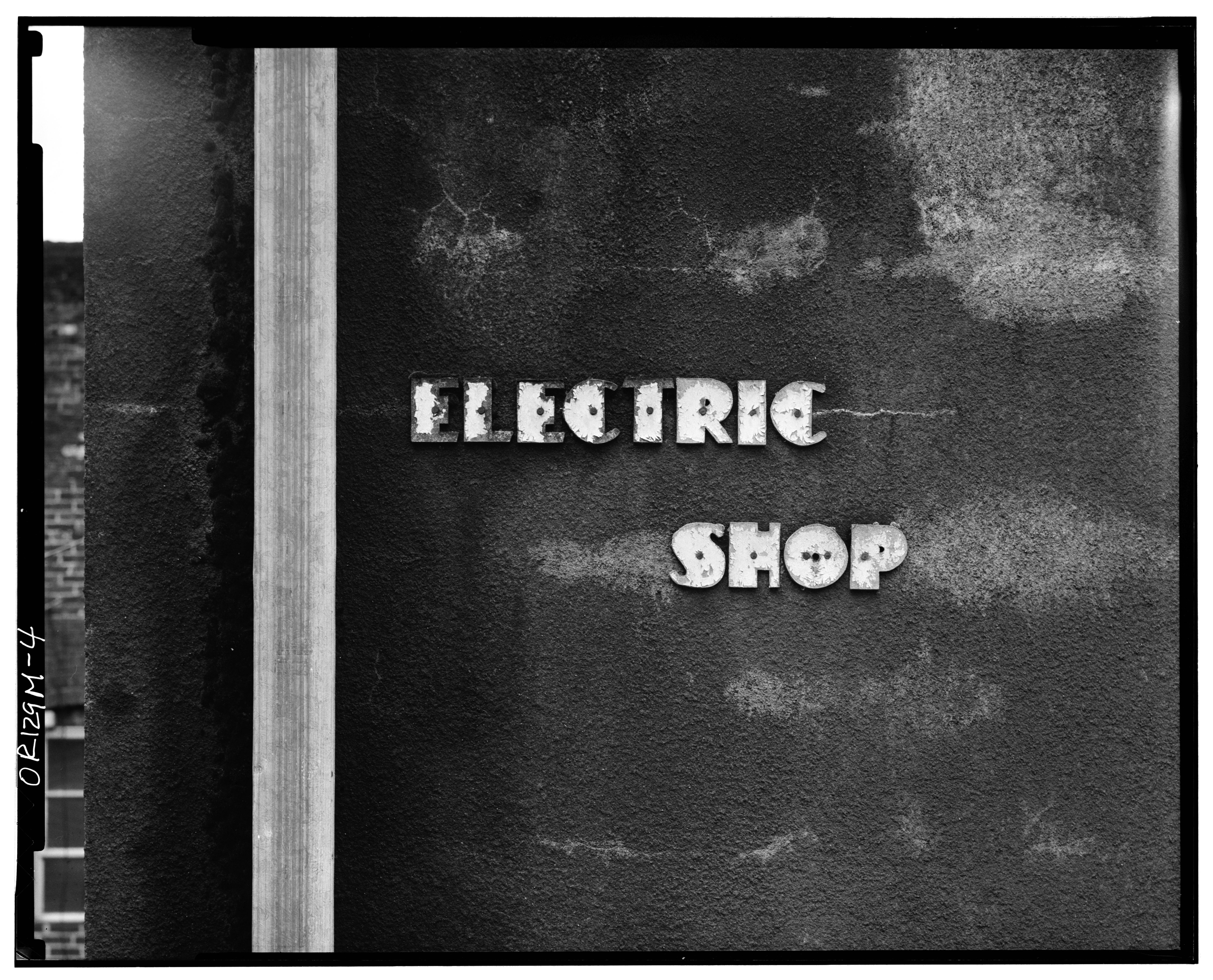
Electric shop sign

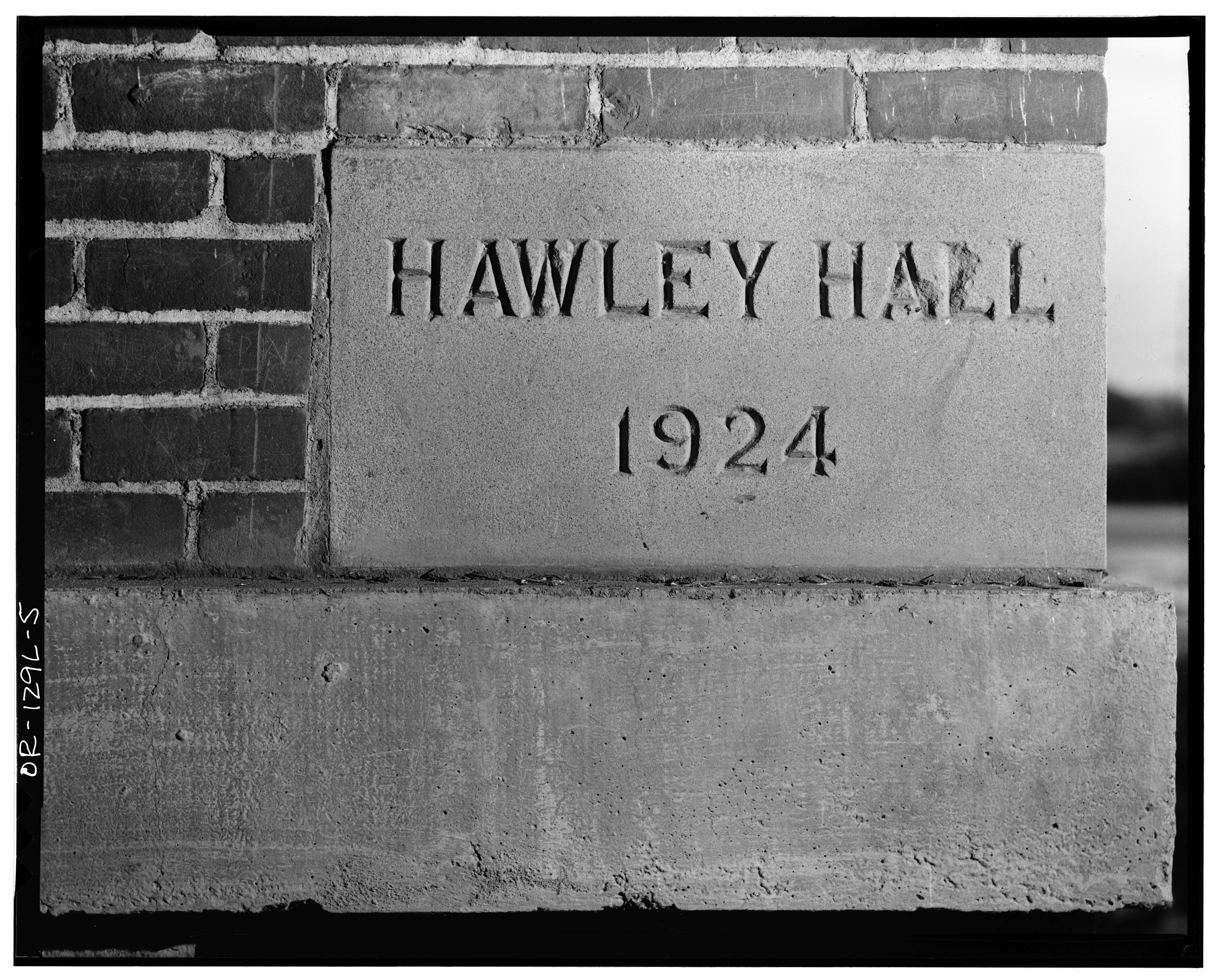
Hawley Hall cornerstone

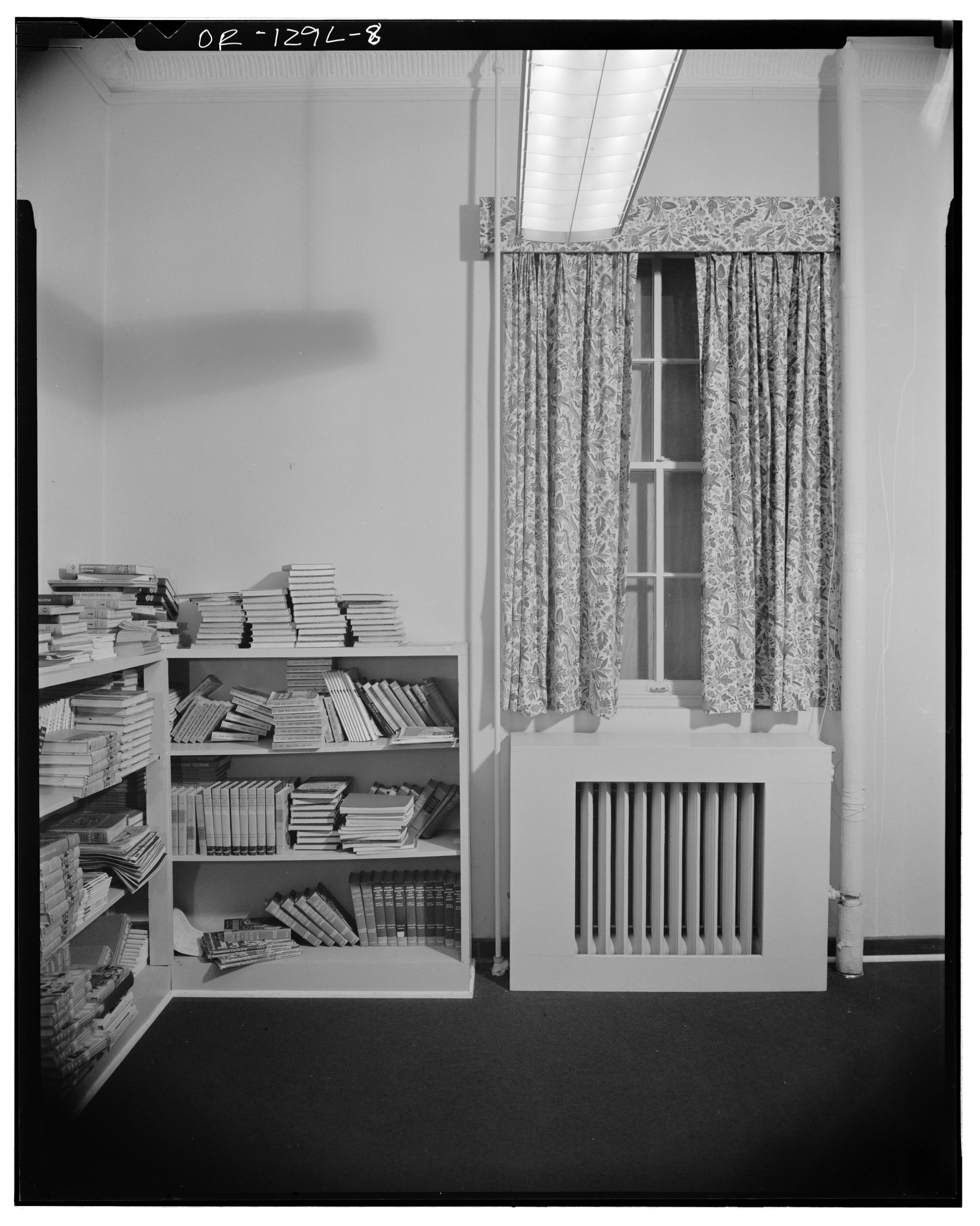
Bookcase at Hawley Hall
