= Pearl Warren =

American community leader

- Warren in 1961
- Born: Pearl Kallappa; August 13, 1911; Neah Bay, Washington, U.S.
- Died: January 16, 1986 (aged 74); Washington, U.S.
- Other names: Pearl Hall
- Occupation(s): Clubwoman, activist
- Children: 3

Pearl Kallappa Warren (August 13, 1911 – January 16, 1986) was an American community leader, based in Seattle. A member of the Makah people, she was the first executive director of the American Indian Women's Service League (AIWSL), leading the group from 1958 to 1969.

== Early life and education ==
Kallappa was born in Neah Bay, Washington, the daughter of Joseph E. Kallappa and Fannie Kallappa. Kallappa was an enrolled member of the Makah people, and lived on the Makah Reservation. Her mother, a Quileute speaker, died in 1916, and she was raised by her grandmother Seatisa after that. She attended the Chemawa Indian School.

== Career ==
Warren was the first executive director of the American Indian Women's Service League (AIWSL), and served as the group's leader from 1958 to 1969. AIWSL began when several women worked together to organize meals, clothing, and shelter for Native American newcomers to Seattle, often meeting people in need on the street or at bus stations. During her tenure, the group opened the Seattle Indian Center in 1960, and began publishing the Indian Center News, later known as the Northwest Indian News. The organization held the first North American Indian Jamboree and Benefit Ball in 1961, and an annual salmon bake fundraiser. She stepped down as director of the Seattle Indian Center in 1971.

Warren clashed with Bernie Whitebear of the United Indians of All Tribes Foundation, over funding strategies. She was assistant secretary of the Seattle Model Cities Program, and chaired a national organization, Americans Indians United. In 1968, she testified before a Senate committee hearing on Indian education. In 1974, she was appointed to the Washington State Women's Council. Later in the 1970s, she worked on a nutrition program for indigenous seniors in the Seattle area. She represented Seattle on the National Indian Arts and Crafts Board, and served on many committees and boards for city and church work.

== Personal life and legacy ==
Kallappa married Joseph Hall, who was Jamestown S'Klallam, and Carl C. Warren. She had three children: Charles Hall, Raymond Hall, and Mary Jo Butterfield. Warren died in 1986, at the age of 74, in Washington. The AIWSL disbanded in 1980, but the Seattle Indian Center continues to be a resource and support for Native Americans in the Seattle area. The Pearl Warren Building in Seattle's Little Saigon neighborhood has housed a homeless shelter and navigation center since 2017, but these programs are scheduled for relocation, and the building is scheduled for demolition in 2025.
