= Bugonaygeshig =

Native American chief

Bugonaygeshig (from Ojibwe Bagonegiizhig: "Hole in the Sky" or "Opening in the Sky") , referring to the constellation Pleiades) was an Anishinaabe leader of the late 19th century and early 20th century. Bugonaygeshig was native to the Leech Lake Indian Reservation of Minnesota. The Anishinaabe people of the Leech Lake Reservation are known as the Pillagers, another term for the military and police totem of the Anishinaabe people. They were called by members from other Anishinabe totems, the Noka Nation or Nooke-doodem. The Nooke clan were the most numerous of the clans of the Anishinaabe people.

== Early life ==
Chief Bugonaygeshig was born in either 1835, 1836, or 1839. His birthplace was probably in north central Minnesota. His Anishinabe name, Bugonaygeshig, was very popular at the time (19th century) in Minnesota and still is. Though, historians claim Ogimaa (chief) Bagonegiizhig was never an actual leader, that could be misleading. Ogimaa Bagonegiizhig did not become well known among the whites until the 1890s. He had four wives and four children during his life.

== The 1889 Nelson Act ==
On January 14, 1889 the United States approved the Nelson Act of 1889 to forcibly relocate Minnesota's Chippewa Reservations, except the Red Lake Reservation and White Earth Reservation. The goal of the 1889 Nelson Act was to relocate all Minnesota Chippewas to the White Earth Reservation. The Nelson Act was named after Minnesota congressman Knute Nelson.

== The 1898 Rebellion ==
In 1898 Chief Bugonaygeshig became widely known among the Chippewas of Minnesota. Many Chippewas had already been relocated to the White Earth Reservation by 1898. The Leech Lake Reservation and all other Minnesota Chippewa Reservations, except Red Lake and White Earth, had been abolished. However, many Chippewas continued to live on their Reservations and the whites dealt with a determined people who did not want to lose their remaining land. The U.S. government continued to pressure the Indians to relocate to White Earth Reservation and sign away their Reservations. Chief Quewezance (Ogimaa Gwiiwizens) was an instrumental ogimaa who strongly demanded that the Leech Lake Reservation remained closed.

Following Gewezance's efforts to keep the Leech Lake Reservation closed, he was killed by several Indians.

Being forced to walk back to the Leech Lake Reservation from Duluth (an over 100 mile journey), after being arrested for bootlegging, Chief Bugonaygeshig became extremely angry. On September 15, 1898 the United States government attempted to arrest him again. The event occurred at Onigum on September 15, 1898 after Chief Bugonaygeshig and Shaboondayshkong, paid a visit to the village for supposed annuity payments. While there, the two Chippewa men were arrested by U.S. government officers who then tried to lead the two men to a boat for a trip to Duluth, for another bootlegging trial.

While they were being transported to the boat, ogima Bugonaygeshig called out for help which many of the Chippewas responded to. While the crowd of Chippewas gathered, the two Chippewa leaders made their espcape. Instead of pursuing the two fleeing Chippewa leaders, the Indian Agent at Leech Lake Reservation knew he could only call for military support. Conditions were now in place for a battle. The Battle of Sugar Point was not over an average Anishinabe citizen facing jail time but was about saving all Minnesota Chippewa Reservations.

Once the commander of Fort Snelling received the message from Onigum, he sent a force of 20 soldiers to the Leech Lake Reservation. They arrived at Walker which was very near the Reservation, on September 30. As was custom, the United States first attempted to negotiate but met with a negative response. With the Chippewas not willing to negotiate, another telegram was sent to Fort Snelling requesting for more soldiers. An indication that the United States wanted to show a stronger military presence or the Chippewa's soldiers were increasing in numbers for a war.

On October 5, 1898 a force of 78 U.S. soldiers invaded the Leech Lake Reservation. The other 20 soldiers who first responded did not participate in the battle. They boarded boats and landed on Sugar Point. They found ogima Bugonaygeshigs cabin but not Bugonaygeshig. They did, however, make two arrests. An Indian account of how the battle commenced, tells of white soldiers shooting at boats carrying Chippewa women. Most of the casualties occurred within 30 minutes of the start of the battle.

It would last for two days. The casualties of the U.S. soldiers and the U.S. civilians who accompanied them, was 7 killed and 14 wounded or 21 total casualties. No Chippewa casualties occurred. Some reports claim only 19 Chippewa soldiers fought in the battle. The Chippewa men who fought in the Battle of Sugar Point, probably never saw military action before that battle.

On October 6, 1898 more white reinforcements arrived to Walker, Minnesota. They numbered 215. Including the 62 white soldiers who were not wounded in the battle, they numbered 277. The battle may have ended but the Chippewas who fought in the battle, refused to surrender. The United States responded by negotiating with Chippewa leaders, including with ogima Bugonaygeshig and those Chippewas who refused to surrender. Historians may claim other events occurred but ogima Bugonaygeshig and the Chippewas under his leadership refused to end the war.

An agreement was reached between ogima Bugonaygeshig and other Chippewa leaders and representatives of the United States, which set aside a new and larger closed Leech Lake Reservation. The White Earth Reservation was the focal point of this 1898 Rebellion.

== Later life ==
Ogima Bugonaygeshig would live another 18 years after the Battle of Sugar Point. The United States let the old man be. They did not pursue him after the battle to arrest him. On May 17, 1916, Ogima Bugonaygeshig died. He was between 77 and 81 years old.
