= Beaver Creek =

Beaver Creek may refer to:

== Places ==
=== Canada ===
==== Communities in Canada ====
- Beaver Creek, British Columbia, an unincorporated community on Vancouver Island
- Beaver Creek, Saskatchewan, a hamlet
- Beaver Creek, Yukon, a town

==== Waterways in Canada ====
- Beaver Creek (Alberta), a tributary of the Oldman River
- Beaver Creek (Manitoba), one of nine creeks of that name in Manitoba
- Beaver Creek (York Region), Ontario, a tributary of the Rouge River

==== Other places in Canada ====
- Beaver Creek Provincial Park, British Columbia
- Beaver Creek Provincial Park (Manitoba)
- Beaver Creek Camp, a Salvation Army camp in Saskatchewan

=== United States ===
==== Communities in the United States ====
- Beaver Creek, Alabama, an unincorporated community
- Beaver Creek, Colorado, an unincorporated community
  - Beaver Creek Resort, a ski area
- Beaver Creek, Illinois, an unincorporated community, also a creek that flows near the community
- Beaver Creek, a former railway station in Allen, Kentucky
- Beaver Creek, Maryland, an unincorporated community
- Beaver Creek, Minnesota, a city
- Beaver Creek, Montana, a census-designated place
- Beaver Creek, Ashe County, North Carolina, an unincorporated community
- Beaver Creek, Texas, an unincorporated community and census-designated place
- Beaver Creek Township (disambiguation)

==== Waterways in the United States ====
===== Alaska =====
- Beaver Creek (Yukon River tributary)
- Beaver Creek (Kenai, Alaska), a tributary of the Kenai River

===== Colorado =====
- Beaver Creek (Colorado), a tributary of the South Platte River
- Beaver Creek (Arkansas River tributary)

===== Idaho =====
- Beaver Creek (Camas Creek), a tributary of Camas Creek
- Beaver Creek (Rock Creek), a tributary of Rock Creek

===== Kansas =====
- Beaver Creek (Sappa Creek tributary), also in Nebraska

===== Minnesota =====
- Beaver Creek (Minnesota River)
- Beaver Creek (Split Rock Creek), also in South Dakota
- Beaver Creek (Upper Iowa River)

===== Missouri =====
- Beaver Creek (White River tributary)
- Beaver Creek (Little Piney Creek)
- Beaver Creek (Gasconade River), also in Texas

===== Nebraska =====
- Beaver Creek (Niobrara River tributary)
- Beaver Creek (Sappa Creek tributary), also in Kansas

===== New York =====
- Beaver Creek (Tompkins County, New York), a tributary of Fall Creek
- Beaver Creek (New York)

===== North Carolina =====
- Beaver Creek (New Hope River tributary)
- Beaver Creek (Reedy Fork tributary)
- Beaver Creek (Fisher River tributary)

===== Ohio =====
- Beaver Creek (Raccoon Creek tributary)
- Beaver Creek (Lorain County, Ohio)
- Beaver Creek (Mercer County, Ohio)

===== Pennsylvania =====
- Beaver Creek (Buttermilk Creek), a tributary of Buttermilk Creek
- Beaver Creek (Lehigh River)
- Beaver Creek (Swatara Creek tributary)
- Beaver Creek (Tinicum Creek)

===== Tennessee =====
- Beaver Creek (Tennessee), a tributary of the Clinch River
- Beaver Creek (Piney River)

===== Texas =====
- Beaver Creek (Gasconade River tributary), also in Missouri
- Beaver Creek (Wichita River tributary)

===== Other states =====
- Beaver Creek (Arizona), near Montezuma Castle National Monument
- Beaver Creek (Colorado), a tributary of the South Platte River
- Beaver Creek (Brandywine Creek tributary), Delaware
- Beaver Creek (Kishwaukee River tributary), Illinois
- Beaver Creek (Polk County, Iowa), a tributary of the Des Moines River
- Beaver Creek (Kentucky)
- Beaver Creek (Montana), a tributary of the Missouri River
- Beaver Creek (Crooked River), Oregon
- Beaver Creek (Yellow River tributary), Wisconsin

==== Other places in the United States ====
- Beaver Creek Massacre Site, Colorado
- Beaver Creek Wilderness, Kentucky
- Beaver Creek State Park, Ohio
- Beaver Creek State Natural Area, Oregon
- Beaver Creek Falls (Lane County, Oregon)
- Beaver Creek Plantation, Virginia, a former plantation

== Other uses ==
- Beaver Creek Indian Tribe, with headquarters in South Carolina
- Beaver Creek (Pleasure Beach Blackpool), a children's amusement park inside Pleasure Beach Blackpool, Blackpool, Lancashire, England
- The Beaver Creek meteorite of 1893, which fell in British Columbia, Canada (see Meteorite falls)
- Beaver Creek, a fictional television show produced by Pyramid Productions on Made in Canada

== See also ==
- Beavercreek (disambiguation)
- Little Beaver Creek (disambiguation)
- Beaver Brook (disambiguation)
- Beaver River (disambiguation)
- Beaverdam Creek (disambiguation)
