= William J. Cullen =

Major William J. Cullen

Superintendent of the Northern Superintendency
- In office May 13, 1857 – March 27, 1861
- President: James Buchanan; Abraham Lincoln
- Preceded by: Francis Huebschmann
- Succeeded by: Clark W. Thompson

Personal details
- Born: May 1, 1816 Pennsylvania
- Died: December 9, 1870 (aged 54) Saint Paul, Minnesota
- Resting place: Oakland Cemetery; Saint Paul, Minnesota
- Other political affiliations: Democrat

Military service
- Allegiance: United States of America; Minnesota
- Branch/service: Minnesota Militia
- Years of service: 1861-1862
- Rank: Major
- Unit: Cullen Frontier Guards
- Battles/wars: Dakota War of 1862

William J. Cullen (May 1, 1816 – December 9, 1870) was an Indian agent, administrator, politician, and was the Superintendent for the Northern Superintendency of Indian Affairs from 1857-1860. Originally appointed under President of the United States James Buchanan, Cullen became known for embezzling federal funds which were meant for the annuity payments for the Dakota people and the Ojibwe living on reservations in Minnesota. Cullen's misappropriation of funds was a significant contributing cause leading up to the Dakota War of 1862 just two years later.

== Early life ==
William J. Cullen was born on May 1, 1816 in Pennsylvania. Not much is known about Cullen's upbringing or family history. Cullen moved to Indiana in the 1850s where he served in the Indiana General Assembly as a Legislator for Cass County, Indiana from November 5, 1856 - November 3, 1858 under Governor of Indiana Joseph A. Wright. Cullen greatly assisted Indiana politician Jesse D. Bright in his election to the United States Senate in 1845. Information pertaining to Cullen's service in the Indiana Legislation are part of the William Hayden English papers collection (1741-1928) which are held by the Indiana Historical Society.

== Northern Superintendency ==
On May 13, 1857 Cullen was appointed as the Superintendent of the Northern Superintendency of Indian Affairs by President James Buchanan. By September, 1858 Cullen was living in Minnesota Territory in Saint Paul, Minnesota after being appointed as the Northern Superintendent. The Northern Superintendency was first established in 1851 and was abolished by 1876, it consisted of the superintendencies for the modern-day states of Michigan, Minnesota, and Wisconsin.

Cullen's September 28, 1858 report states "There exists no reason why these Indians should not rapidly progress in a gradual settlement into agricultural habits, and be brought to an entire abandonment of their roaming life. An effort to produce the result of relinquishment of their present tribal organizations, and a permanent settlement upon lands set apart to them and held as their own property, should be the object to be attained, for which the agent's views are especially commended to your favorable consideration". Cullen of course is speaking about the Upper Sioux Agency and the Lower Sioux Agency and forcefully converting the Dakota from a nomadic people into a people who utilize permanent settlements and rely on subsistence agriculture.

In May 1859 during the removal of the Ho-Chunk from Wisconsin to Long Prairie, Minnesota Cullen attempted to persuade Ho-Chunk Chief Winneshiek to move to Minnesota by bestowing upon him an Indian peace medal. Winneshiek refused Cullen's offer, viewing it as a gimmick, and refused to apologize. Chief Winneshiek was promptly "replaced" by the more influenceable Ho-Chunk leader Baptiste Lasallier who was later recognized as the head Chief of the Ho-Chunk at Blue Earth, Minnesota.

According to William Watts Folwell and his book A History of Minnesota: Volume II, in June, 1859 Cullen was appointed with the rank of Major within the Minnesota militia and was placed in charge of the 12th Minnesota Infantry Regiment, a "paper regiment" which had not yet been formally mustered. Cullen was eventually replaced as the Superintendent for the Northern Superintendency by Clark W. Thompson on March 27, 1861.

On January 1, 1862 special agent George E. H. Day wrote a letter addressed to Abraham Lincoln warning of an impending war with the Dakota or Ojibwe in Minnesota. Day had been hired by William P. Dole, the Commissioner of Indian Affairs, in order to investigate Cullen and the Northern Superintendency of Indian Affairs for what were viewed as depredations against the Dakota and Ojibwe.

Day reported the following in his January 1, 1862 letter to Lincoln and Dole:

"The Superintendent Major Cullen, alone, has saved, as all his friends say more than 100 thousand in four years out of a salary of 2 thousand a year and all the Agents whose salaries are 15 hundred a year have become rich. The Indians are decreasing in numbers & yet their payments never increase but year after year have also decreased to each person & in the aggregate. The whole system is defective & must be revised or, your red children, as they call themselves, will continue to be wronged & outraged & the just vengeance of heaven continue to be poured out & visited upon this nation for its abuses & cruelty to the Indian. I most sincerely desire to aid Mr. Dole & Hon Mr. Smith in revising & perfecting the trade & intercourse laws & regulations with the cooperation such honest men as Judge Doolittle & others who desire that the placing of the Government in the hands of an honest man shall result in honest & free & humane dealings & transactions with the poor defrauded & degraded Indians of our frontiers".

George E.H. Day's letter rebuking Cullen came far too late. By August 1862 Little Crow and many of the Mdewakanton, Sisseton, Wahpeton, and Wahpekute Dakota began their uprising which resulted in the Dakota War of 1862.

== Role in the Dakota Uprising ==
At the outbreak of the Dakota War of 1862 Cullen organized the Cullen Frontier Guard or "Cullen Guard", a mounted militia, in Saint Paul, St. Peter, Minnesota and Brown County, Minnesota on August 22, 1862. The Cullen Guard was purported to be 200 men-strong, however, official roster reports from the state of Minnesota state they were only around 82 men strong and was split between two companies; Major William J. Cullen's company of 23 men from St. Paul, and Captain Joseph Anderson's company of 59 men from St. Peter and Traverse des Sioux. The Cullen Guard's only major engagement was the Battle of Birch Coulee where it served as a scouting force under the command of Captain Hiram P. Grant, Captain Anderson, and Major Joseph R. Brown. Members of the Cullen Guard, including Captain Anderson, went on to serve with the 1st Minnesota Cavalry Regiment and the 2nd Minnesota Cavalry Regiment among others.

== Later life ==
Following the Dakota War of 1862 Cullen unsuccessfully ran as a Democrat state representative for the Minnesota House of Representatives District 2 in the November 4, 1862 election. Cullen lost to Ignatius L. Donnelly by a margin of 16.82%. Cullen died on December 9, 1870 in Saint Paul at age 54 due to cardiovascular disease. He is buried in Oakland Cemetery in Saint Paul.

Cullen's home, locally called the Cullen House, still remains in Saint Paul. It is a private home and is located at 698 Stewart Avenue near the Mississippi River. The house features a mansard roof and is constructed of gray stone. The house was used as a Veterans of Foreign Wars (VFW) post, the Blue Ribbon Club of Saint Paul, and even as a Protestant Orphan asylum.
