= Beaver Brook =

Beaver Brook may refer to several places:

== Canada ==
- Beaver Brook, New Brunswick, in Albert County
- Beaver Brook Station, New Brunswick, or Beaverbrook, in Northumberland County
- Beaver Brook, Nova Scotia
- Beaver Brook Estates, Alberta
- Beaver Brook Park, Alberta

== United States ==
- Beaver Brook, Wisconsin, a town in Washburn County
  - Beaver Brook (community), Wisconsin
- Beaver Brook Association nature center, in New Hampshire
- Beaver Brook Falls, in Colebrook, New Hampshire
- Beaver Brook Reservation, a state park in Belmont and Waltham, Massachusetts
- Beaver Brook State Park, in Connecticut
  - Beaver Brook (Connecticut), a stream
- Beaver Brook (Merrimack River tributary), in New Hampshire and Massachusetts
- Beaver Brook (Mohawk River tributary), in New York
- Beaver Brook (New Jersey), a tributary of the Pequest River
- Beaver Brook station (closed), in Waltham, Massachusetts

== See also ==
- Beaverbrook (disambiguation)
- Beaver Creek (disambiguation)
- Beaver River (disambiguation)
