= Hiram P. Grant =

American military officer (1828–1897)

Hiram Perry Grant
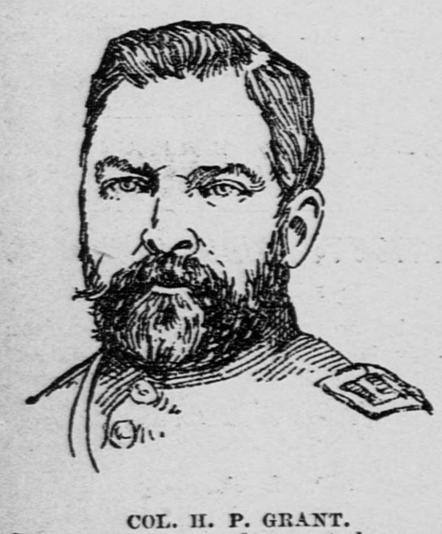
- Sketch of Grant in an 1887 article from the Saint Paul Daily Globe

Member of the Military tribunal for the Mankato hangings
- In office September 28, 1862 – November 3, 1862

Personal details
- Born: December 12, 1828 Roxbury, Vermont, U.S.
- Died: October 5, 1897 (aged 68) Saint Paul, Minnesota, U.S.
- Resting place: Oakland Cemetery; Saint Paul, Minnesota, U.S.
- Spouse: Isabella McLeod
- Children: 1
- Profession: Firefighter; military officer

Military service
- Allegiance: United States; Minnesota
- Branch/service: Union Army
- Years of service: 1862-1865
- Rank: Lieutenant Colonel; Brevet Colonel
- Unit: 6th Minnesota Infantry Regiment
- Commands: Company A, 6th Minnesota Infantry Regiment
- Battles/wars: American Civil War; Dakota War of 1862; Sibley's 1863 Campaign

Hiram Perry Grant (December 12, 1828 - October 5, 1897) was a Saint Paul firefighter and Minnesota military officer. During his military career Grant served in the Dakota War of 1862, Sibley's 1863 Campaign, and the American Civil War. Grant was one of the officers in command of the burial party which was ambushed by Mankato and Big Eagle during the Battle of Birch Coulee. Grant was later a member of the seven-man military tribunal which oversaw the trial and execution of the 38 Dakota men during the 1862 Mankato mass execution.

== Early life ==
Hiram Perry Grant was born on December 12, 1828 in Roxbury, Vermont. He was the son of Joseph Grant and Lucy Cram. Grant was married to Isabella McLeod (1833-1883) on December 25, 1852, in Boston. According to the 1857 Minnesota Territorial census, which was mandated at the time to qualify for statehood, Grant was living in Saint Paul, Minnesota. According to the Ramsey County Historical Society previous to his military career Grant was employed as a fireman for the Pioneer Hook and Ladder Company, a volunteer fire department. The Pioneer Hook and Ladder Company was first established in 1854 in Saint Paul by local carpenter R. C. Knox and consisted of 30 volunteers.

== Military career ==
=== Dakota War ===
At the outbreak of the American Civil War Grant enlisted into the ranks the 6th Minnesota Infantry Regiment on August 16, 1862. Grant was elected as the Captain of Company A which primarily was recruited from Ramsey County and Dakota County in Minnesota. The 6th Minnesota Infantry Regiment was part of President of the United States Abraham Lincoln's call for 600,000 additional troops for the Union Army's war effort in order to suppress the Confederate States of America. Instead of being sent to the South however, five companies of the 6th Minnesota would be sent west on the Minnesota frontier in order to suppress the Dakota War of 1862 led by the Mdewakanton Dakota leader Little Crow.

=== Battle of Birch Coulee ===
Historical map of Battle of Birch Coulee, by survivor Robert K. Boyd

Following the attack at the Lower Sioux Agency and the Battle of Fort Ridgely, commander of Minnesota volunteers Colonel Henry Hastings Sibley detailed a burial party from Fort Ridgley to bury those who had been killed in the prior days attacks. The burial party was under the command of Captain Grant and included several members of the local mounted militia, the Cullen Frontier Guard under Captain Joseph Anderson, along with 17 teamsters and wagons with a total of roughly 170 men. Grant's burial detachment also consisted of several civilians as well including Indian agent Thomas J. Galbraith and Minnesota physician Jared Waldo Daniels, the assistant surgeon of the 6th Minnesota and the previous physician for the Upper Sioux Agency. Militia Major Joseph R. Brown, whose family were taken as hostages during the initial uprising later joined the column with a section of his militiamen. The inclusion of Brown to the detail would later cause confusion about who was in charge of the burial detail later on (see Command controversy).

The burial detail party left Fort Ridgely on August 31 around 10:00am. On the first day the burial detail found and buried an estimated 28 victims. On the second day Grant, Brown, and Anderson's forces split up, Grant heading north towards Beaver Creek to search for more victims, while Anderson and Brown headed south towards the Lower Sioux Agency. While on the north side of the Minnesota River Grant's detachment found the body of Indian trader and translator Peter Patrick Quinn and 20 of Captain Marsh's soldiers who had been killed during the Battle of Redwood Ferry. Grant's force later moved north towards Beaver Creek. Near Beaver Creek Grant came upon Mrs. Justina Krieger, a German refugee who was part of Paul Kitzman's party which had tried to escape to Fort Ridgely from Sacred Heart, Minnesota near Flora Township, but were killed in what is known as the Kitzman Massacre or the Massacre at Sacred Heart. Grant's burial party later rendezvoused with Brown and Anderson at an arranged location near a coulee known at the time as Birch Coulee near modern-day Morton, Minnesota.

On the evening of September 2, 1862 Grant's detachment created their camp of Sibley tents near Birch Coulee. Anderson and Brown soon joined Grant's command later that evening. During the night a scouting force of roughly 200 Dakota under the command of Gray Bird, Big Eagle, Red Legs, and Mankato crossed the Minnesota River and surrounded the camp. Around 4:30am one of Grant's pickets, Private William Hart spotted an unknown figure he thought was a dog and shot at it. The Dakota quickly returned musket fire and inflicted heavy casualties on the camp. Many of the men of Grant's Company A and the rest of the detachment were wounded or killed as a result of the surprise attack. Grant's account states "Already twenty-two of our men were deadly or mortally wounded. Sixty more had received serious or slight wounds. One-half of our whole force was killed wounded. Eighty-five horses were dead, leaving only two alive". During the initial attack Captain Grant was reported as being in a panicked state and shouting "we shall all be scalped".

On the morning of September 3, 1862 Sibley arrived at Birch Coulee with a relief column consisting of six companies of reinforcements of the 6th Minnesota Infantry Regiment, two companies of the 7th Minnesota Infantry Regiment, a cavalry section of the 1st Minnesota Cavalry Regiment under the command of Samuel McPhail, and a small artillery section. Minnesota Judicial Judge James J. Egan, then a young volunteer described the scene as follows:

"The scene presented in our camp was a sickening one. Twenty-three men, black and discolored by the sun's rays, lay stark and dead in a small space; forty-five others, severely wounded and groaning and crying for water ; the carcasses of ninety dead horses lying about, and a stench in- tolerable emanating from the whole ground".

=== 1862 military tribunal ===
Following the disaster at Birch Coulee and the Surrender at Camp Release, Grant was part of the military tribunal commission which was appointed to adjudicate the role of several Dakota men who were accused of partaking in the Dakota Uprising. A full list of the members of the military commission includes:

- Colonel William Crooks: Commander of the 6th Minnesota Infantry Regiment
- Captain Hiram Perry Grant: Captain of Company A of the 6th Minnesota
- 1st Lieutenant Rollin C. Olin: Lieutenant of Company B of the 3rd Minnesota Infantry Regiment
- Captain Hiram S. Bailey: Captain of Company C of the 6th Minnesota, later promoted to Major of the 6th Minnesota
- Colonel William Rainey Marshall: Colonel of the 7th Minnesota Infantry Regiment, only heard the first 29 cases
- Major George Bradley: Major of the 7th Minnesota Infantry Regiment, who replaced Colonel Marshall
- Isaac Van Duzer Heard: Ramsey County Attorney and as the Saint Paul City Attorney, court reporter for the commission

The commission convened at Camp Release on September 28, 1862, Sibley later moved his command to the Lower Sioux Agency where the commission resumed deliberating on October 25, 1862. The commission was assisted by Métis translator Antoine D. Frenière, an associate of Stephen Return Riggs. During the commissions proceedings the number of cases had originally started out small, however, this number had amassed to over 300+ separate cases. The commission which had originally worked diligently on each case hence had to work expediently to finish put the accused on trial. During this time the commission had settled over 40 cases in one day, some cases being heard for as little as 5 minutes. In the end the commission had tried 392 prisoners, had sentenced 307 to death, and 16 to life imprisonment. President Lincoln however, would commute the sentence of the majority of the Dakota men, all except 38 who were executed by hanging in Mankato, Minnesota on December 26, 1862.

=== Sibley's Expedition ===
Following the Dakota Uprising General Sibley along with General Alfred Sully started a campaign aimed at suppressing the Dakota and removing them from Minnesota's border territory, the Dakota Territory, in order to curb any possibilities of a second Dakota uprising on Minnesota's frontier. Both Sibley and Sully's campaigns are categorized as punitive expeditions and affected much of the displacement of Dakota, Lakota, Nakota, and Sioux people from Minnesota.

Grant with the rest of the 6th Minnesota regiment took part in Sibley's 1863 Campaign, also called Sibley's Expedition, from June–September 1863. The 6th Minnesota would take part in the following battles during Sibley's Expedition:

- Battle of Big Mound
- Battle of Dead Buffalo Lake
- Battle of Stony Lake

=== American Civil War ===
Following Sibley's 1863 Campaign Grant and the rest of the 6th Minnesota were sent to the Western theater of the American Civil War. The 6th Minnesota left Fort Snelling on June 14, 1864 for Helena, Arkansas. In Arkansas, the regiment observed guerrilla forces in the region but participated in no battles. After a few months, the men were sent to St. Louis and New Orleans in late January 1865. Grant was later promoted to the rank of Major on April 9, 1864 and Lieutenant Colonel on October 28, 1864. Grant mustered out of service with the rest of the regiment on August 19, 1865.

== Later life ==
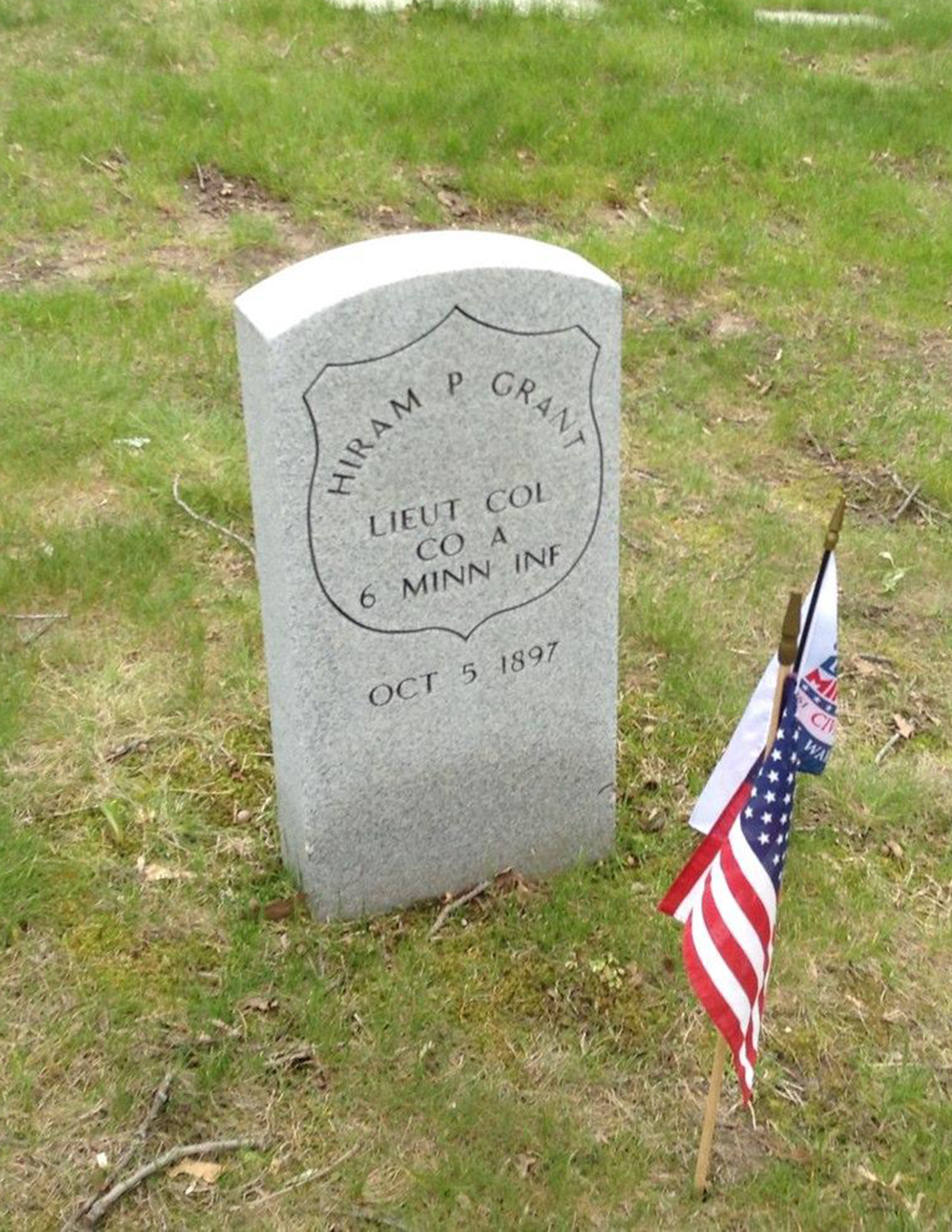
Hiram P. Grant's gravestone in Oakland Cemetery in Saint Paul, Minnesota

Following the war Grant lived in Saint Paul, Minnesota. Grant and Isabella McLeod had one child, Charles B. Grant. Grant died on October 5, 1897 at the age of 68. Grant is buried in Block 13, Lot 31 in Oakland Cemetery in Saint Paul.

== Command controversy ==
Many Minnesota historians, such as Kenneth Carley of the Minnesota Historical Society, have debated who had overall "command" of the military burial party during the battle of Birch Coulee, Major Joseph R. Brown, Captain Joseph Anderson of the Cullen Frontier Guard, or Captain Grant of the 6th Minnesota. Carley contents that Major Brown had overall command of the detachment due solely to his rank (Major). Other sources however, argue that Captain Grant had overall command of the detachment including the book Minnesota in the Civil and Indian Wars: 1861-1866 stating "Amid the great confusion it is a wonder every man was not destroyed. But there were cool heads, and none were cooler than old Joe Brown, Harry Gillham, Dr. Jared W. Daniels and Capt. H. P. Grant, who was in immediate command".

On September 4, 1862 immediately following the battle Grant tried to submit his after action report about the expedition and battle to Colonel Sibley, only to be rebuffed by Henry Hastings Sibley who told him to report to his commanding officer, Major Joseph R. Brown. Grant promptly destroyed his original report. Grant's own report from Minnesota in the Civil and Indiana Wars: 1861-1866 states the following:

"Sunday morning, August 31st, at Fort Ridgley, Minn., I was ordered to report in person to Col. William Crooks*, commanding my regiment; I reported, and received the following orders: To take command of an expeditionary force, consisting of Company A, Sixth Minnesota Volunteer Infantry, Capt. Joseph Anderson's company of Mounted Rangers, and a detail of twenty men, as a burial party, making the aggregate one hundred and fifty men, and proceed at once to make a reconnaissance toward the lower agency, bury the dead and afford relief to any who might have escaped the Indians".

Grant later gave a detailed firsthand account arguing that he commanded the military detachment during the battle of Birch Coulee in the August 27, 1887 issue of The St. Paul Globe. Similarly, Robert K. Boyd who served in Company F of the 6th Minnesota who was present at Birch Coulee later wrote a detailed firsthand account of the battle in order to vindicate Grant titled The Battle of Birch Coulee: A Great Disaster in the Indian War of 1862: Who Should Bear the Blame?: A Story of the Battle and a Vindication of Captain Hiram P. Grant. Boyd states that it matters who commanded the unit because "The result of the expedition was a disaster, and it is logical to say that somebody was at fault; and that the reputation of being in command would at best be but a doubtful honor. There would be much force in this view, that is, if the question of who was in command were the only matter affecting Grant's reputation as a soldier". He later states however that no direct charges were ever made against Captain Grant by Sibley, Brown, or Anderson, and that Brown himself for suggesting the ground the encamp on should be to blame for the disaster at Birch Coulee.
