= Beaverbrook =

Beaverbrook may refer to:

== People ==
- Baron Beaverbrook, of Beaverbrook in the Province of New Brunswick in the Dominion of Canada and of Cherkley in the County of Surrey, a title in the Peerage of the United Kingdom
  - Max Aitken, 1st Baron Beaverbrook, newspaper publisher and World War II Minister of Aircraft Production
    - Beaverbrook Newspapers
  - Maxwell Aitken, 3rd Baron Beaverbrook, British politician and honorary RAF officer

== Places ==
- Beaverbrook, Alberta, Canada
- Beaverbrook, Ottawa, Canada
- Beaver Brook Station, New Brunswick, from which Baron Beaverbrook is named
- Beaverbrook, Connecticut, United States

== Other uses ==
- Beaverbrooks, a British jeweller
- Beaverbrook Art Gallery, in Fredericton, New Brunswick, Canada

== See also ==
- Beaver Brook (disambiguation)
- Camp Beaverbrook, near Cobb Mountain, in Lake County, California, U.S.
- Lord Beaverbrook High School in Calgary, Alberta, Canada
