= Beaver River =

Beaver River may refer to:

== Rivers ==
=== Canada ===
- Beaver River (Canada), in Alberta and Saskatchewan
- Beaver River (Columbia River tributary), in British Columbia
- Beaver River (Liard River tributary), in British Columbia and Yukon
- Beaver River, or Holmes River, in British Columbia
- Beaver River, or Sutherland River, in British Columbia
- Beaver River (Grey County), in Ontario
- Beaver River (Kapiskau River tributary), in Ontario
- Beaver River (Lake Simcoe), in Ontario
- Beaver River (Severn River tributary), in Ontario
- Beaver River (Thunder Bay District), in Ontario
- Beaver River (Stewart River), in Yukon

=== United States ===
- Beaver River (Lake Superior), in Minnesota
- Beaver River (Cloquet River tributary), in Minnesota
- Beaver River (Bear Island River tributary), in Minnesota
- Beaver River (New York)
- Beaver River (Oklahoma)
- Beaver River (Pennsylvania)
- Beaver River (Rhode Island)
- Beaver River (Utah)

== Places ==
- Beaver River, Alberta, Canada
- Rural Municipality of Beaver River No. 622, Saskatchewan, Canada
- Beaver River, Nova Scotia, Canada
- Beaver River, New York, U.S.
- Beaver River (federal electoral district) (1987–1996), in Alberta, Canada
- Beaver River (provincial electoral district) (1913–1952), in Alberta, Canada
- Holmes River, British Columbia, Canada, formerly Beaver River

== Maritime ==
- Beaver River (ship, 1942), see Boats of the Mackenzie River watershed

== See also ==
- Beaver Creek (disambiguation)
- Beaver Brook (disambiguation)
