= Mankato (Mdewakanton) =

Mdewakanton Dakota sub-chief

Chief Mankato Makato
- Makato
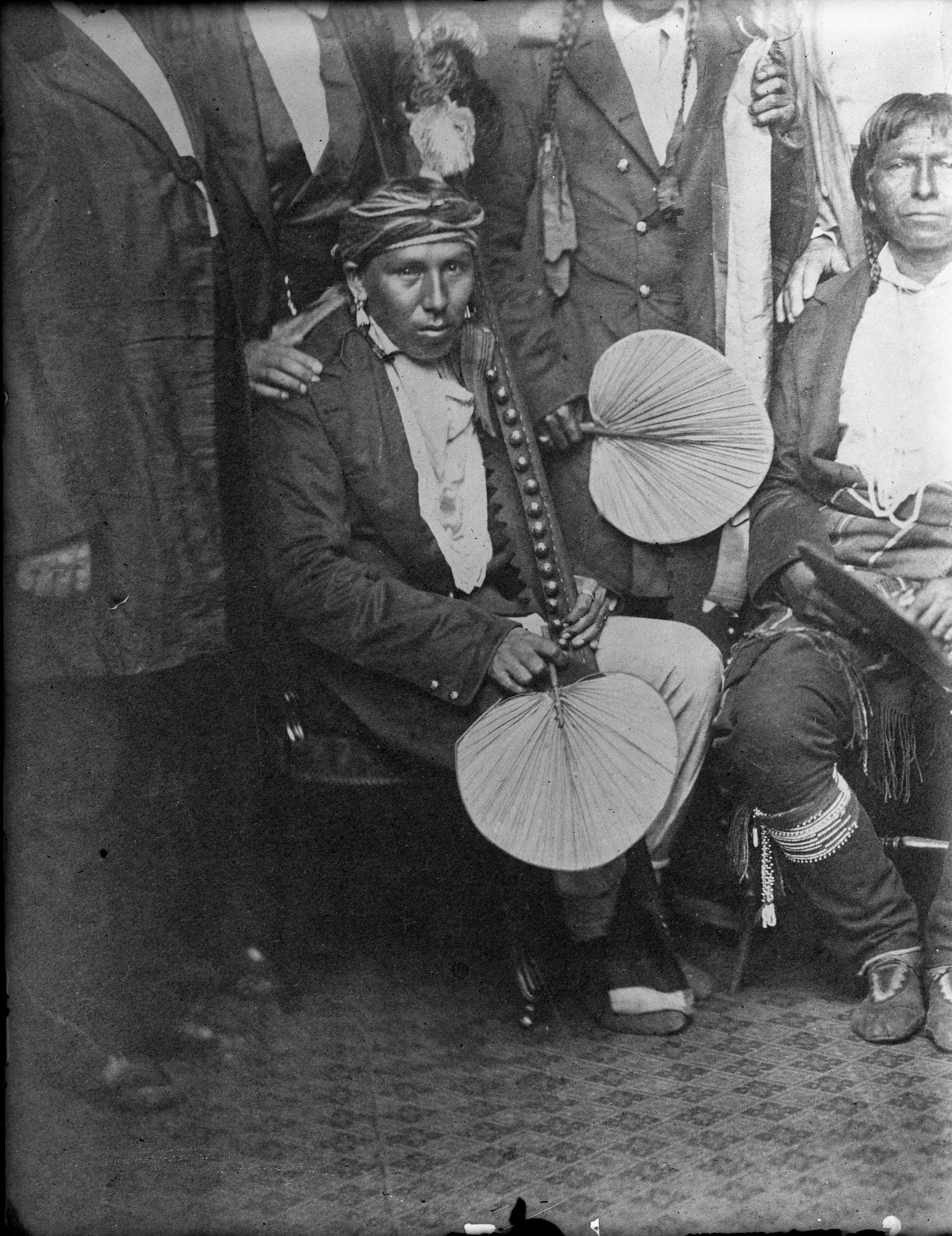
- Chief Mankato (seated left) in 1858 during the signing of the Treaty with the Sioux, 1858.
- Born: 1822; Near Mankato, Michigan Territory, U.S.
- Died: September 23, 1862 (aged 39–40); Wood Lake Battlefield, Yellow Medicine County, Minnesota, U.S.
- Cause of death: Killed by round shot from a cannon
- Relatives: Good Road (Father)
- Military career
- Allegiance: Mdewakanton and Dakota people
- Known for: Signatory of the 1858 Sioux Treaty
- Conflicts: Dakota War of 1862; Battles of New Ulm; Battle of Fort Ridgely; Battle of Birch Coulee; Battle of Wood Lake †

Mankato (Dakota: Makato; c. 1822 – September 23, 1862) sometimes referred to as Chief Mankato was a Mdewakanton Dakota sub-chief who was instrumental in the signing of the 1858 Dakota Treaty along with other Dakota leaders, including Little Crow. Mankato was later involved in the Dakota War of 1862 where he was killed in action at the Battle of Wood Lake.

== Early life ==
Mankato was born around 1822 near the Mdewakanton village of Mankato in Blue Earth County, Minnesota. Mankato was the son of Good Road/Good Path (Dakota:Čhaŋkú Wašté), after whose family the village of Mankato was named. Mankato's name is derived from the nearby Blue Earth River, which takes its name from the Dakota phrase "Makato Osa Watapa," or "the river where blue earth is gathered", blue earth referring to the blue-green colored clay which came from the river Blue Earth River valley.

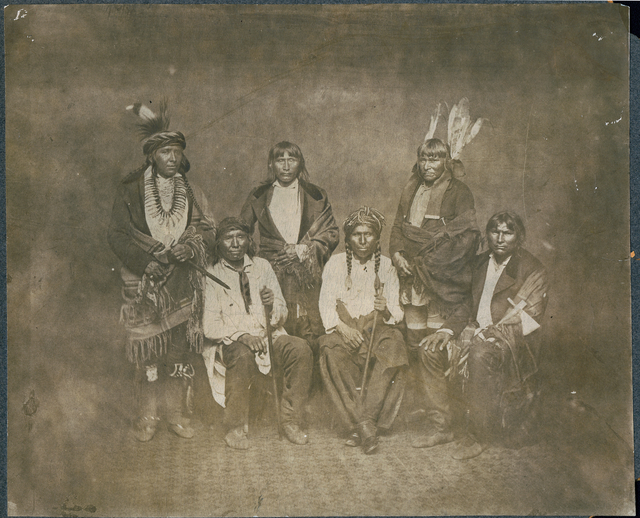
The 1858 Mdewakanton Treaty Delegation in Washington, D.C.

On June 19, 1858, Mankato was a member of the Mdewakanton delegation sent to Washington, D.C. to sign the 1858 Dakota Treaty. The 1858 Treaty with the Dakota defined the boundaries of the Lower Sioux Agency as that portion of the strip defined in the Treaty of Traverse des Sioux lying south of the Minnesota River. Notably, this excluded the northern half of the land previously allotted to the Dakota. Additional provisions for surveying the land, allotting land to individual families, law enforcement, compensation payments, and economic development were also included. Other signatories of the treaty include; Little Crow, Wabasha III, He Has a War Club, Big Eagle, Traveling Hail, and Red Legs among many others. Mankato appears on the left in the famous photograph of the treaty signers made at a photography studio in Washington, D.C.

After the treaty, Indian Superintendent Major William J. Cullen and Indian Agent Joseph R. Brown strongly encouraged the Dakota to become farmers. Those who did so were provided with farming equipment, livestock, and a small house. Mankato was one of the Dakota who decided to become an assimilated and "civilized" farmer. Mankato is mentioned in the Indian Affairs Report for 1860, as his village was on the borders of the Lower Sioux Agency. Some Dakota farmers were referred to as "cut hairs" as their hair was cut so as to blend in and assimilate to American and European culture. According to the 1860 Report of Commissioner of Indian Affairs, Mankato's Band was allotted 134 acres of plowed land for agriculture which produced 100 acres of corn, 15 acres of potatoes, 10 acres of turnips, 3 acres of assorted vegetables, and 6 acres of beans.

== Role in the Dakota Uprising ==
Mankato, like other Dakota leaders protested their unfair treatment and living conditions on the reservations along with other mistreatments and depredations by Indian agents and clerks such as Andrew Myrick on the Upper Sioux Agency and Lower Sioux Agency during the winter, spring, and summer of 1862. Paired with unfulfilled treaty obligations on the side of the United States Government including late annuity payments left many Dakota people starving and dying on the reservations. These actions against the Dakota by the Minnesota state government and Federal government among other reasons ultimately led to the Dakota War of 1862 led by Little Crow. Mankato, along with Big Eagle, and Shakopee III assisted Little Crow during the uprising and took part in several of the key engagements of the uprising including the Battle of Fort Ridgely, the Battles of New Ulm, the Battle of Birch Coulee, and the Battle of Wood Lake.

=== The Battle of Fort Ridgley ===
During the Battle of Fort Ridgely Chief Mankato led a small contingent of Dakota warriors including men of the Mdewakanton, Wahpekute, Sisseton, and Wahpeton in an assault on Fort Ridgely, the closest military base to the Upper Sioux Agency. Mankato's forces were unsuccessful in breaching the fort due to the fact that the defending garrison had several M1841 6-pounder field guns which kept the attacking Dakota in check. Mankato briefly took overall command from Little Crow as Little crow had been wounded in the initial attack.

=== The Battles of New Ulm ===
On Saturday morning of August 23, 1862 following the Battle of Fort Ridgley, Mankato took his group to the south towards New Ulm, Minnesota and engaged with allied Dakota during the Battle of New Ulm. Mankato and Big Eagle arrived to New Ulm with 650 men and were both in command of the Dakota forces during the final day of the battle. By 9:30pm Mankato and Big Eagle's forces retreated from the battle.

=== The Battle of Birch Coulee ===
Several weeks later Little Crow and the Dakota renewed their attack at the Battle of Birch Coulee. The Battle of Birch Coulee was one of the most significant defeats of the United States Army against the Dakota during the whole of the conflict. Mankato was present at the battle and led a group of Dakota alongside Wamditanka (Big Eagle) and Zitkadaska (Gray Bird) who were Mdewakanton, while Hushasha (Red Legs) was a Wahpekute chief. Early in the morning on September 2, 1862, the combined Dakota forces crossed the Minnesota River and surrounded the camp, by the next day had decimated much of the burial party of soldiers from Company A of the 6th Minnesota Infantry Regiment as well as the Cullen Frontier Guards militia.

Big Eagle recounted Mankato during the battle stating "Mankato at once took some men from the coulie and went out to meet them. He told me he did not take more than fifty, but he scattered them out and they all yelled and made such a noise that the whites must have thought there were a great many more, and they stopped on the prairie and began fighting. They had a cannon and used it, but it did no harm... Mankato flourished his men around so, and all the Indians in the coulie kept up a noise, and at last the whites began to fall back, and they retreated about two miles and began to dig breastworks." Mankato also convinced Samuel McPhail that his force was larger than it really was causing McPhail to send for help from Timothy J. Sheehan at Fort Ridgely. Ultimately the Dakota siege of the small military party was lifted by the combined forces of McPhail and William Rainey Marshall on the morning of September 3, 1862.

=== The Battle of Wood Lake ===
On September 23, 1862 Henry Hastings Sibley and a force of 1,600 United States Volunteers engaged against Little Crow's forces by a small lake near the Yellow Medicine River in Yellow Medicine County, Minnesota, the engagement became known as the Battle of Wood Lake. The battle started at 7:00am, and only lasted two hours. Fourteen Dakota and four whites were killed during the course of the battle. Among the dead Dakota was Chief Mankato who had been killed by round shot from a cannon emplaced in Sibley's camp. Gary Anderson's Through Dakota Eyes: Narrative Accounts of the Minnesota Indian War of 1862 gives the following account told by Big Eagle about the death of Mankato:

"This Mankato was not the old chief for whom the town was named, but a sub-chief, the son of old Good Road. He was a very brave man and a good leader. He was killed at the battle of Wood Lake by a cannon ball. We went down to the attack on both sides of the river. I went down on the south side with my men, and we crossed the river in front of the fort and went up through the timber and fought on that side next [to] the river".
