= Jared W. Daniels =

American physician, Indian agent (1827–1904)

Jared Waldo Daniels
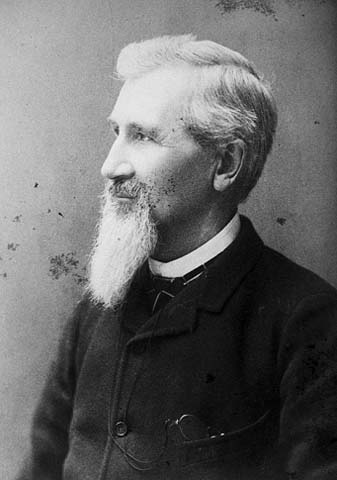
- Dr. Jared Waldo Daniels in 1895
- Born: June 15, 1827; Stratford, New Hampshire, U.S.
- Died: May 3, 1904 (aged 76); Los Angeles, California, U.S.
- Burial place: Woodlawn Cemetery; Kasota Township, Minnesota, U.S.
- Education: Bellevue Hospital Medical College
- Spouse(s): Virginia Beardsley (m. 1856), Ella Norcross Winslow (m. 1882)
- Children: 4
- Military career
- Allegiance: United States of America
- Branch: Union Army
- Service years: 1862–1865
- Rank: Major (Surgeon)
- Units: 6th Minnesota Infantry Regiment; 2nd Minnesota Cavalry Regiment
- Conflicts: American Civil War; Dakota War of 1862; Sibley's 1863 Campaign; Sully's Expedition
- Other work: Physician; Indian agent

Signature
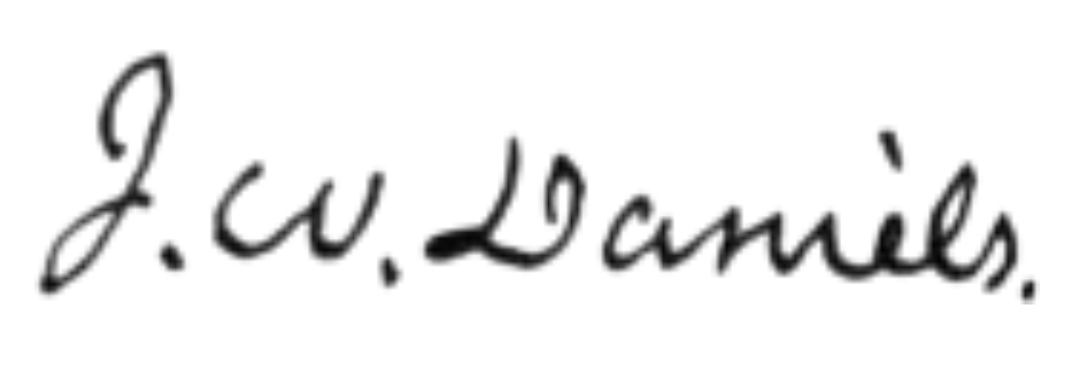

Jared Waldo Daniels (June 15, 1827 – May 3, 1904), sometimes written as J.W. Daniels, was an American Indian agent and medical doctor who settled St. Peter, Minnesota and worked as the physician of the Upper Sioux Agency. Daniels later served as the Indian agent of the Sisseton Dakota at Fort Wadsworth from 1869 to 1871, and later worked in a variety of capacities for the Bureau of Indian Affairs from 1871 to 1887.

== Early life ==
Jared Waldo Daniels was born on June 15, 1827 in Stratford, New Hampshire, to parents Joseph Daniels and Roxana Hatch. Daniels was educated in a common school in Lancaster, New Hampshire before quitting school to work as a cabinet maker in the carpentry trade. Daniels later studied medicine under his maternal uncle Dr. B.F. Hatch while in Boston and later attended medical school at the Bellevue Hospital Medical College in New York City.

Beginning in 1855 Daniels moved to Minnesota Territory to St. Peter, Minnesota in Nicollet County to join his brother, Dr. Asa Wilder Daniels in practicing medicine on the frontier. Daniels' brother Asa had been in Minnesota Territory since 1853 and was employed as the doctor of Fort Ridgely and the Lower Sioux Agency. Meanwhile, Daniels was appointed as the primary physician of the Upper Sioux Agency while also holding a private practice in St. Peter.

== Military service ==
At the outbreak of the Dakota War of 1862 Daniels served in non-combatant civilian capacity with his brother Asa as part of the militia relief force led by Charles Eugene Flandrau during the Battles of New Ulm. During the two battles the Daniels brothers assisted New Ulm Doctor Carl Weschcke and Le Sueur Doctor William Worrall Mayo in providing medical assistance to the wounded.

Daniels later volunteered to follow a detachment of the 6th Minnesota Infantry Regiment as a civilian surgeon in order to assist a burial party sent from Fort Ridgely following the attack at the Lower Sioux Agency. Daniels accompanied the burial party and detachment of soldiers led by Hiram P. Grant, Joseph Anderson, and Joseph R. Brown which were eventually attacked at night by the Dakota at the Battle of Birch Coulee. Daniels survived the battle and eventually enlisted in the 6th Minnesota Infantry Regiment and fought in Sibley's 1863 Campaign as the regiment's assistant surgeon before resigning from the military on December 28, 1863. Daniels later re-enlisted into the ranks of the 2nd Minnesota Cavalry Regiment as the regiment's surgeon on January 4, 1864 and served during Sully's Expedition in 1864.

Following Sully's Expedition Daniels served as the surgeon of Fort Snelling where he took care of the imprisoned Dakota people. During his time at Fort Snelling Daniels openly protested the Dakota's mistreatment by the Minnesota government and the sanitary conditions they lived in. Daniels was eventually mustered out of service in 1865 and returned to his medical practice in St. Peter.

== Later career ==
In 1868 Henry Benjamin Whipple, the Bishop of the Episcopal Church in Minnesota, recruited Daniels to assist him in distributing goods to Indigenous people living at Fort Wadsworth (now Fort Sisseton) near the Lake Traverse Indian Reservation. Daniels was later appointed as the Indian agent to the Sisseton in 1869, Daniels held this position until 1870 when he relocated to Wyoming Territory and served as the Indian agent for the Oglala at the Red Cloud Agency. During this time Sisseton Wahpeton Oyate Chief Gabriel Renville gifted to Daniels a Čhaŋnúŋpa (sacred pipe) which was carved out of catlinite in Daniels likeness. This catlinite pipe is now part of the Karen Daniels Peterson American Indian Collection at the Minneapolis Institute of Art.

Daniels later worked in a variety of capacities for various Indian agencies across the United States and was later appointed as the Inspector of Agencies in Montana, Idaho, Washington, New Mexico, and Arizona. Daniels was later in charge of a variety of commissions for the Bureau of Indian Affairs including the commission which ceded the Black Hills to the United States government in 1876. In 1887 Daniels moved to Faribault, Minnesota where he eventually retired from practicing medicine. Daniels later moved to Los Angeles in the early 1900's where he lived for his final years. Daniels died on May 3, 1904 in Los Angeles, his body was returned to St. Peter, Minnesota and is buried at the Woodlawn cemetery in St. Peter alongside his first wife and children.

== Personal life ==
Daniels married Hortense Virginia Beardsley on June 28, 1856, together they had four children: Jared Waldo Daniels Jr., George Cullen Daniels, Hortense Virginia Daniels, and Asa Wilder Daniels. Daniels was later remarried after the death of his first wife in 1869, Daniels married Ella Norcross Winslow of Faribault on August 11, 1882.
