= Birch Coulee Battlefield =

- Birch Coulee
- U.S. National Register of Historic Places
- Minnesota State Register of Historic Places
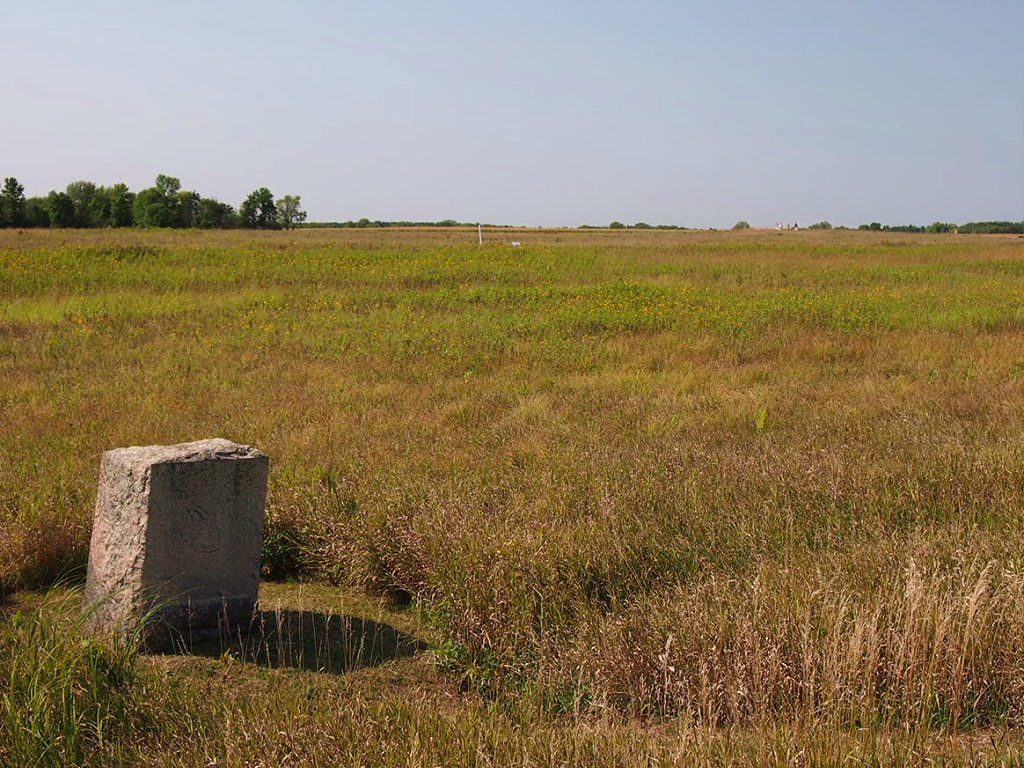
- Birch Coulee Battlefield with historical marker

- Location within Minnesota Location within the United States
- Location: Junction of Renville County Highways 2 and 18, Birch Cooley Township, Minnesota
- Nearest city: Morton, Minnesota
- Coordinates: 44°34′34″N 94°58′35″W
- Area: 82 acres (33 ha)
- NRHP reference No.: 73000995

Significant dates
- Fought: September 2–3, 1862
- Added to NRHP: June 4, 1973

Birch Coulee Battlefield in Renville County, Minnesota, United States, was the site of the Battle of Birch Coulee, the costliest military engagement for U.S. forces during the Dakota War of 1862. It is now a historic site with self-guided trails and markers interpreting the battle from both sides. Birch Coulee was nominated to the National Register of Historic Places for having state-level significance in military history, and was listed in 1973.

== Geography ==
Birch Coulee Battlefield lies on what, in 1862, was open prairie stretching on to the north and west, with woods to the south. Defining the east edge is a steep wooded ravine, a landform known locally by the French term "coulee," also spelled "coulie" or "cooley." Birch Coulee, known to the Dakota as Tanpa Yukan (Place of the White Birch), is 60 feet (18 m) deep and runs for a total of seven miles (11 km) down to the Minnesota River. A few hundred yards to the west of the coulee, the prairie rises slightly onto a gentle knoll.

== Battle of Birch Coulee ==
On September 1, 1862, a reinforced burial detail including 170 Minnesota volunteer infantry, cavalry, teamsters and civilians with Major Joseph R. Brown camped on the prairie, 200 yards from the timber along Birch Coulee. The site was selected by Captain Hiram P. Grant of the 6th Minnesota Volunteer Infantry Regiment. A group of Dakota led by Gray Bird (Zitkahtahhota), upon arriving in Little Crow's village to collect plunder they had left behind, saw Captain Joseph Anderson's mounted guards in the distance and sent scouts to track them to the campsite. Although its proximity to wood and water was convenient, the campsite was in a poorly defensible position, easily surrounded within gunshot distance while providing cover for attackers.

That night, 200 Dakota warriors surrounded the camp while they slept; Brown's men believed that they were safe, having encountered no signs of Dakota over the first two days of the burial expedition. Around 4 am on September 2, one of the sentinels shot at a figure moving in the grass, triggering an ambush by the Dakota which inflicted heavy casualties and killed most of the horses within the first hour. Although the Dakota forces had planned to capture the camp, Brown's men returned fire, using the carcasses of the dead horses as barricades and hastily digging rifle pits. As the siege dragged on, both sides resorted to conserving ammunition and fired only occasionally; trapped within the "corral," the burial party was completely cut off from fresh water.

Sixteen miles (26 km) away at Fort Ridgely, a guard reported distant gunfire, and 240 men led by Colonel Samuel McPhail were dispatched as a relief party. They came within sight of their besieged comrades, but Chief Mankato took about 50 of his men out to meet them. Whooping and shouting while moving around in the tall grass and in the ravine, they frightened McPhail into thinking they were surrounded by several hundred Dakota; he ordered his troops to retreat two miles and sent a messenger back to Fort Ridgely for more reinforcements. Shortly after midnight, Colonel Henry Hastings Sibley reached McPhail's bivouac with his entire remaining force and artillery. After daybreak, Sibley made his way slowly to Birch Coulee, shelling the area as he went; he finally entered the campsite around 11 am, as the Dakota slipped away, ending the 31-hour siege. The U.S. casualties in the battle were thirteen soldiers dead on the ground, almost fifty wounded, and ninety horses killed; many more died afterwards of their wounds. In his famous narrative of the Dakota War of 1862, Chief Big Eagle (Wamditanka) recalled that only two Dakota men had lost their lives in the Battle of Birch Coulee.

== Location of state monument ==
The first effort to officially preserve the Birch Coulee battlefield came in 1893, when the Minnesota Legislature appointed a commission to acquire the land with a $2,500 budget and authority to use eminent domain. Inexplicably the commission chose instead to acquire a 1.75-acre (0.71 ha) property two miles (3.2 km) south of the battlefield, on the fairgrounds of the Renville County Agricultural Society east of the village of Morton. In response to protests about the location of the planned monument, the commission let it be known that the owner of the battlefield site was asking for an exorbitant price and that a sufficient area had been donated at their preferred location, which would be "graded, inclosed and beautified without cost to the state." Furthermore, they argued that their preferred location was attractive, situated high on a bluff overlooking the Minnesota River and the battleground, and that the monument itself would be visible to railroad travelers.

In the summer of 1894, the commission raised a 46-foot (14 m) granite monument of conventional design on the former fairgrounds. At the dedication ceremony of the Birch Coulee State Monument on September 3, 1894, former governor William Rainey Marshall lambasted the commission in his speech, criticizing both the incorrect location of the monument and its inscriptions as falsifying history.

== Battlefield preservation ==
The state legislature provided additional money in 1895, along with clear instructions to secure acreage on the actual battlefield, but no action was taken. As of 1926, the site had become a wheatfield; the condition of the property at that time is described in detail by Battle of Birch Coulee survivor Robert K. Boyd, who also noted "slight elevations and slopes" in the terrain. In retracing the location of the campsite, he observed that it had been on "a slight swell of ground" that had allowed the Dakota forces to easily drop below their line of sight while exchanging fire.

It wasn't until 1929, following a resurgence of community advocacy, that the state acquired the site and proclaimed it the Birch Cooley Battle Field State Memorial Park. In 1937 a Works Progress Administration crew helped develop the park, reseeding the land and building amenities like trails, roads, picnic area, and a parking lot.

In 1976 legislative action redesignated the property a state historic site and transferred management to the Minnesota Historical Society. The Historical Society redeveloped the battlefield beginning in 1998 and it reopened to the public in 2000. Self-guided interpretive signs describe the battle from the perspectives of Captain Joseph Anderson and Wamditanka (Chief Big Eagle), illustrated with sketches by soldier Albert Colgrave. Guideposts mark the U.S. camp and the positions of the surrounding Dakota. Management has since been transferred to the Renville County Parks Department, which also maintains a campground on site.

== Future of monuments ==
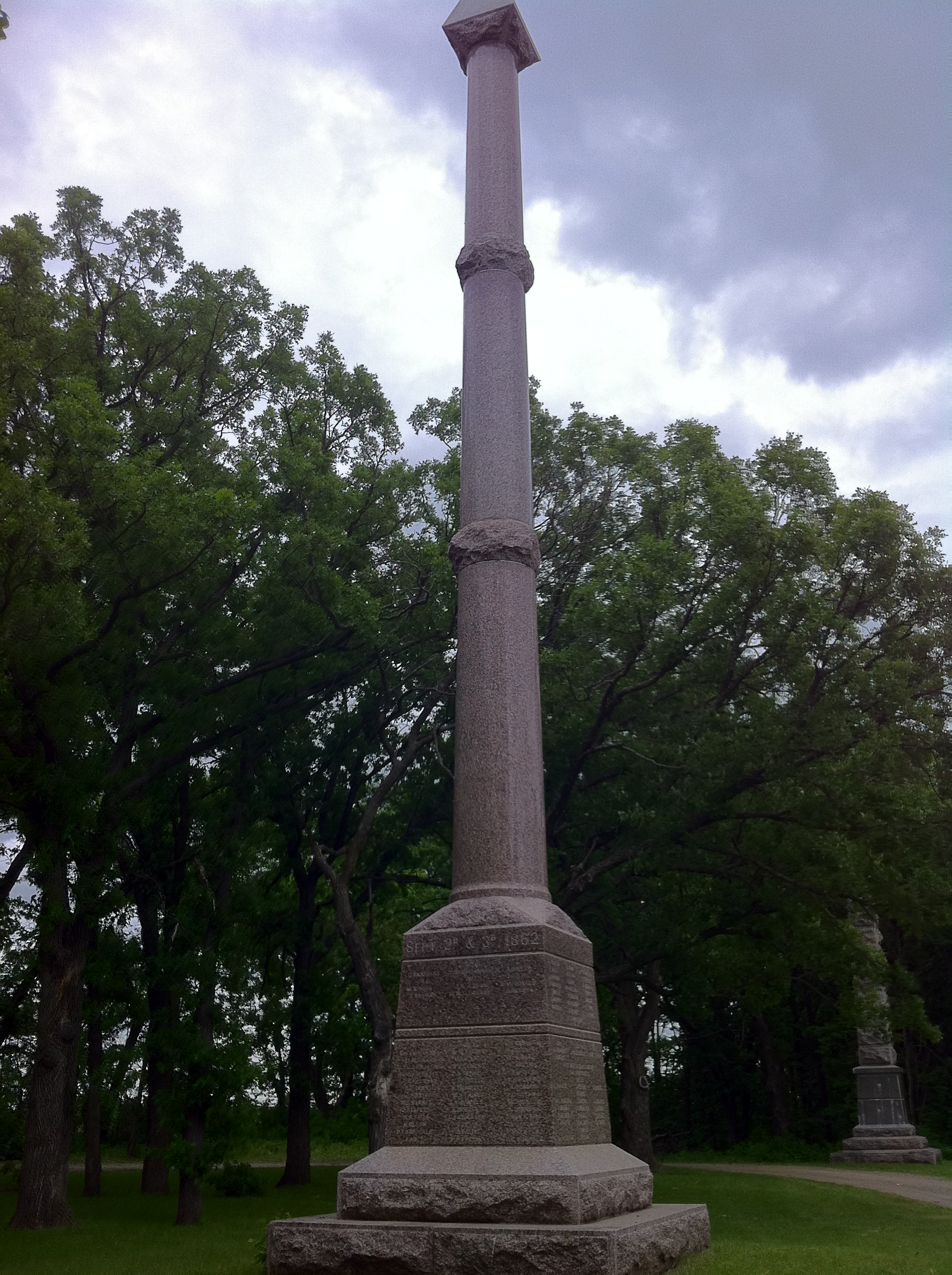
Birch Coulee State Monument in 2011

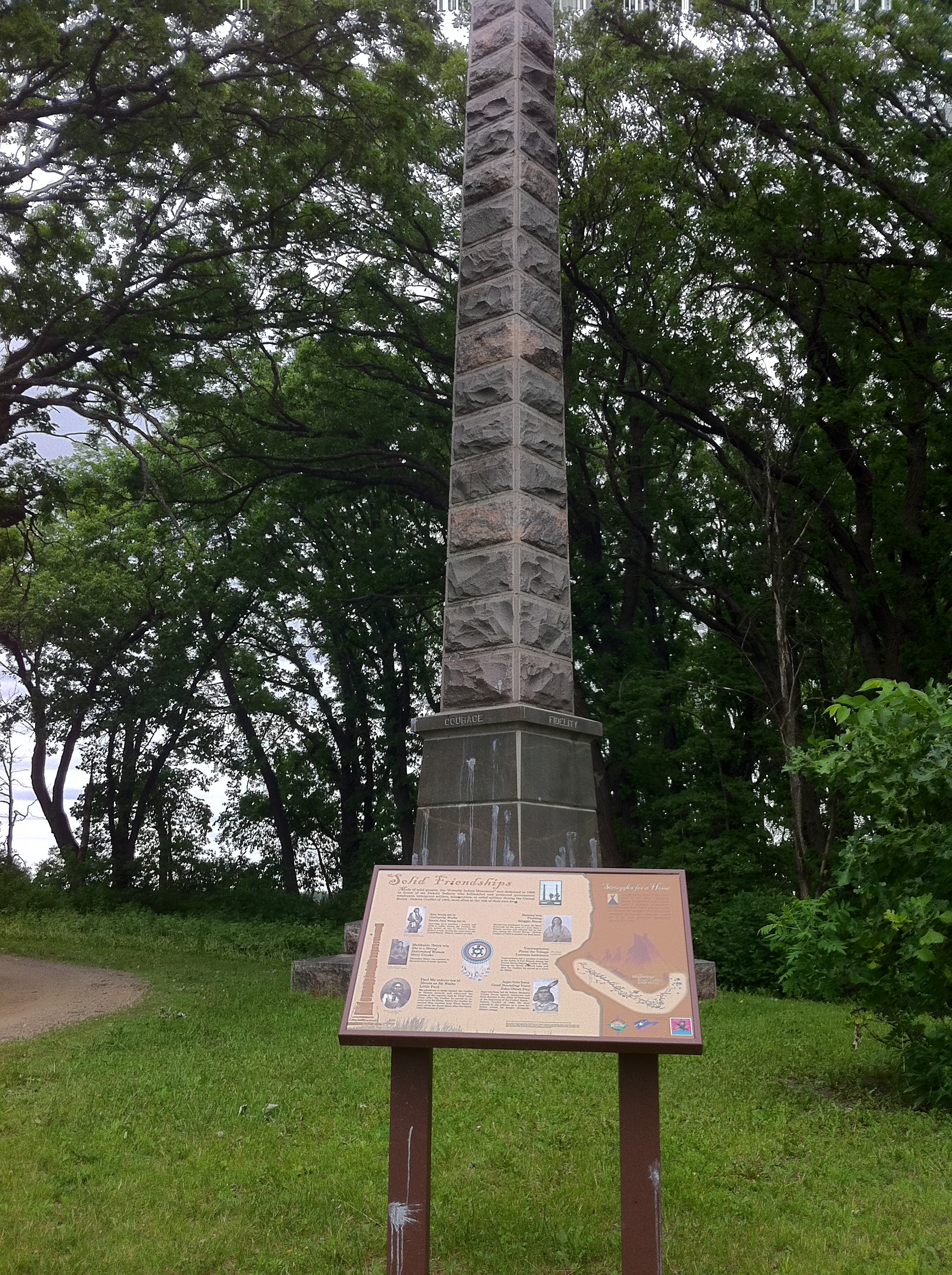
Faithful Indians' Monument in 2011

In 1899, the Minnesota Valley Historical Society erected a 52-foot (16 m) granite monument to "The Faithful Indians" on a site adjacent to the Birch Coulee State Monument. The Faithful Indians' Monument stands "in recognition and commemoration of the conduct and services of the Indians who were truly loyal and faithful to the whites during the great Sioux war of 1862." The Minnesota Valley Historical Society, with the Honorable Charles D. Gilfillan as president and Return I. Holcombe as historiographer, chose to commemorate only "full-blood" Dakota who had remained "unwaveringly loyal and who had saved the life of at least one white person." The six Dakota named on the monument include Other Day (Ampatutokicha), Paul (Mahzakutemanne), Lorenzo Lawrence (Towanetaton), Simon (Anahwangmanne), Mary Crooks (Mahkahta Heiya-win) and Maggie Brass (Snana-win).

In 2020, an article in the Rochester Post-Bulletin pointed out the damage to, and neglect of, both the Birch Coulee State Monument and the Faithful Indians' Monument. Accessed via a steep craggy road, the two obelisk-shaped monuments are no longer visible from a distance, obscured by the surrounding trees and brush. Efforts to address repair and maintenance issues had been held up due to disagreements over which level of government – city, township, county or state – is responsible for upkeep of the site and the road leading up to it. Although there have been many calls over the years to relocate the monuments to the actual Birch Coulee Battlefield site, the Post-Bulletin reported that it was unlikely that they would be moved in the near future, primarily due to the costs associated with such a move.

== See also ==
- National Register of Historic Places listings in Renville County, Minnesota
