= Beaver Township, Fillmore County, Minnesota =

Beaver Township, Minnesota
- Township
- Location within the state of Minnesota Beaver Township, Minnesota (the United States)
- Coordinates: 43°32′21″N 92°24′7″W
- Country: United States
- State: Minnesota
- County: Fillmore

Area
  - Total: 36.1 sq mi (93.4 km^{2})
  - Land: 36.1 sq mi (93.4 km^{2})
  - Water: 0 sq mi (0.0 km^{2})
- Elevation: 1,296 ft (395 m)

Population (2000)
  - Total: 243
  - Density: 6.7/sq mi (2.6/km^{2})
- Time zone: UTC-6 (Central (CST))
  - Summer (DST): UTC-5 (CDT)
- FIPS code: 27-04402
- GNIS feature ID: 0663537

Beaver Township is a township in Fillmore County, Minnesota, United States. The population was 243 at the 2000 census.

Beaver Township was organized in 1858, and named after Beaver Creek.

== Geography ==
According to the United States Census Bureau, the township has a total area of 36.1 square miles (93 km^{2}), all land.

== Demographics ==
As of the census of 2000, there were 243 people, 93 households, and 67 families residing in the township. The population density was 6.7 inhabitants per square mile (2.6/km^{2}). There were 99 housing units at an average density of 2.7 per square mile (1.0/km^{2}). The racial makeup of the township was 100.00% White. Hispanic or Latino of any race were 1.65% of the population.

There were 93 households, out of which 32.3% had children under the age of 18 living with them, 64.5% were married couples living together, 4.3% had a female householder with no husband present, and 26.9% were non-families. 23.7% of all households were made up of individuals, and 11.8% had someone living alone who was 65 years of age or older. The average household size was 2.61 and the average family size was 3.13.

In the township the population was spread out, with 30.0% under the age of 18, 6.6% from 18 to 24, 24.7% from 25 to 44, 23.5% from 45 to 64, and 15.2% who were 65 years of age or older. The median age was 38 years. For every 100 females, there were 100.8 males. For every 100 females age 18 and over, there were 102.4 males.

The median income for a household in the township was $40,625, and the median income for a family was $46,964. Males had a median income of $38,750 versus $26,250 for females. The per capita income for the township was $16,007. About 6.8% of families and 9.1% of the population were below the poverty line, including 11.4% of those under the age of eighteen and 5.4% of those 65 or over.
