= Cullen Frontier Guard =

Cullen Frontier Guard (First Minnesota Mounted Regiment of the Irregular Volunteer Militia)
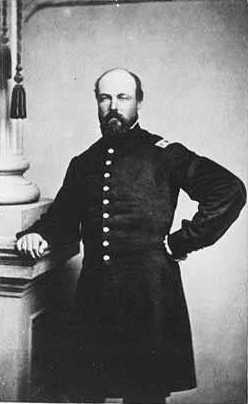
- Captain Joseph Anderson led Company A of the Cullen Frontier Guards. Courtesy of the Minnesota Historical Society.
- Active: August 22, 1862 - September 28, 1862.
- Country: United States
- Allegiance: Union Army
- Branch: Mounted Militia
- Nicknames: Cullen Guard; First Minnesota Mounted Regiment of the Irregular Volunteer Militia
- Engagements: Dakota War of 1862: Battles of New Ulm (Anderson's Company); Battle of Birch Coulee (Anderson's Company)

Commanders
- Major: William J. Cullen
- Captain: Joseph Anderson

The Cullen Frontier Guard, Cullen Guard, or First Minnesota Mounted Regiment of the Irregular Volunteer Militia was a mounted militia unit utilized by the Union army during the Dakota War of 1862. The unit's only two engagements were the Battles of New Ulm and the Battle of Birch Coulee where it served as a guide and scouting force for Henry Hastings Sibley.

== History ==
The "Cullen Frontier Guard" or "Cullen Guard" was raised on August 22, 1862, in both Saint Paul, Minnesota and St. Peter, Minnesota during the Dakota War of 1862 and was led by Major William J. Cullen, an Indian agent and the head of the Northern Superintendency of Indian Affairs since 1857. The unit was a militia primarily made up of frontiersmen from Minnesota, most of which came from St. Peter, Brown County and the surrounding areas. The militia itself was only around 82 men strong and was split between two companies; Major William J. Cullen's company of 23 men from St. Paul, and Captain Joseph Anderson's company of 59 men from St. Peter and Traverse des Sioux. According to an after action report written by Anderson to Jared W. Daniels, another name the militia went by was the "First Minnesota Mounted Regiment of the Irregular Volunteer Militia".

During the Battles of New Ulm Captain Joseph Anderson led Company A of the Cullen Frontier Guards, also known as the "First Minnesota Mounted Regiment of the Irregular Volunteer Militia". Although the unit was not present for the physical battles, Captain Anderson's company of the Cullen Guard was part of the relief force for Charles Eugene Flandrau's militia at New Ulm, Minnesota.

Captain Joseph Anderson's company was chosen by Henry Hastings Sibley and Joseph R. Brown to serve as a reconnaissance scouting force for a burial party which was sent to the nearby Lower Sioux Agency under the overall command of Captain Hiram Perry Grant in order to bury the bodies of people killed during the attack at the Lower Sioux Agency and the Battle of Redwood Ferry.

On August 29, 1862, the burial party left Fort Ridgely and crossed the Cottonwood River heading to the Lower Sioux Agency to recover and bury bodies. The burial party was successful in finding and burying several bodies before encamping near modern-day Birch Cooley Township by the Yellow Medicine River near the Upper Sioux Agency.

While encamped on the prairie at the Birch Coulee the Cullen Guard was eventually involved in the Battle of Birch Coulee where it would take several casualties, including Joseph R. Brown and Captain Joseph Anderson who were both severely wounded. The Cullen Guard and Company A, 6th Minnesota Infantry Regiment would eventually be relieved by Henry Hastings Sibley with reinforcements from both the 6th Minnesota, the 7th Minnesota, and the 1st Minnesota Cavalry Regiment two days later.

== Casualties ==
According to Captain Anderson's official report the Cullen Frontier Guard militia suffered 11 total casualties; 1 officer wounded, 8 enlisted men wounded (2 later died of wounds), and 2 enlisted men killed.

- Killed: 2nd Sergeant Robert Baxter; Private Jacob Freeman.
- Died of Wounds: Private Richard Gibbons; Joseph Warren DeCamp.
- Wounded: Captain Joseph Anderson, Farrier Thomas Barton, Privates A.H. Bunker, Peter Burkman, James Buckingham, George Dashney, and John Martin.

== Later History ==
The Cullen Frontier Guard was disbanded on September 28, 1862, following the Battle of Birch Coulee serving only one month as a militia. Many of the militiamen of this unit would go on to serve in the 1st Minnesota Cavalry Regiment and the 2nd Minnesota Cavalry Regiment among others. Captain Joseph Anderson would later serve as the Captain of Company G of the 1st Minnesota Cavalry Regiment (Mounted Rangers) from November 24, 1862, to November 28, 1863, in the ensuing punitive expeditions against the Dakota at the Battle of Big Mound, Battle of Dead Buffalo Lake, and the Battle of Stony Lake.
