= Beavercreek =

Beavercreek may refer to:

- Beavercreek, Ohio
- Beavercreek Township, Ohio
- Beavercreek, Oregon

== See also ==
- Beaver Creek (disambiguation)
