= Holmes River, British Columbia =

Holmes River
- Location of Holmes River in British Columbia
- Coordinates: 53°16′00″N 120°05′00″W
- Country: Canada
- Province: British Columbia
- Area codes: 250, 778

Holmes River, formerly Beaver River, is an unincorporated settlement in the Robson Valley of east-central British Columbia, Canada, located at the confluence of the river of the same name with the Fraser River, near the village of McBride.

The name Beaver River was used as the name of a local school, Beaver River School. The name Beaver River is thought to derive from the name of a rock formation near the confluence of the Fraser and the Holmes (Beaver) Rivers, although there is a mountain in the Rockies just east and overlooking the area called "The Beaver". The name Holmes River was conferred in 1913 to honour Albert W. Holmes, provincial forest ranger at McBride.
