= Beaver Creek Township =

Beaver Creek Township may refer to:

- Beaver Creek Township, Hamilton County, Illinois
- Beaver Creek Township, Michigan
- Beaver Creek Township, Minnesota
- Beaver Creek Township, Wilkes County, North Carolina, in Wilkes County, North Carolina
- Beaver Creek Township, Steele County, North Dakota, in Steele County, North Dakota
- Beaver Creek Township, Tripp County, South Dakota, in Tripp County, South Dakota

== See also ==
- Beavercreek Township, Ohio
- Beaver Creek (disambiguation)
