= Beaver Brook Association =

Nature center in Milford, New Hampshire, US

Coordinates: 42°43′21″N 71°36′23″W

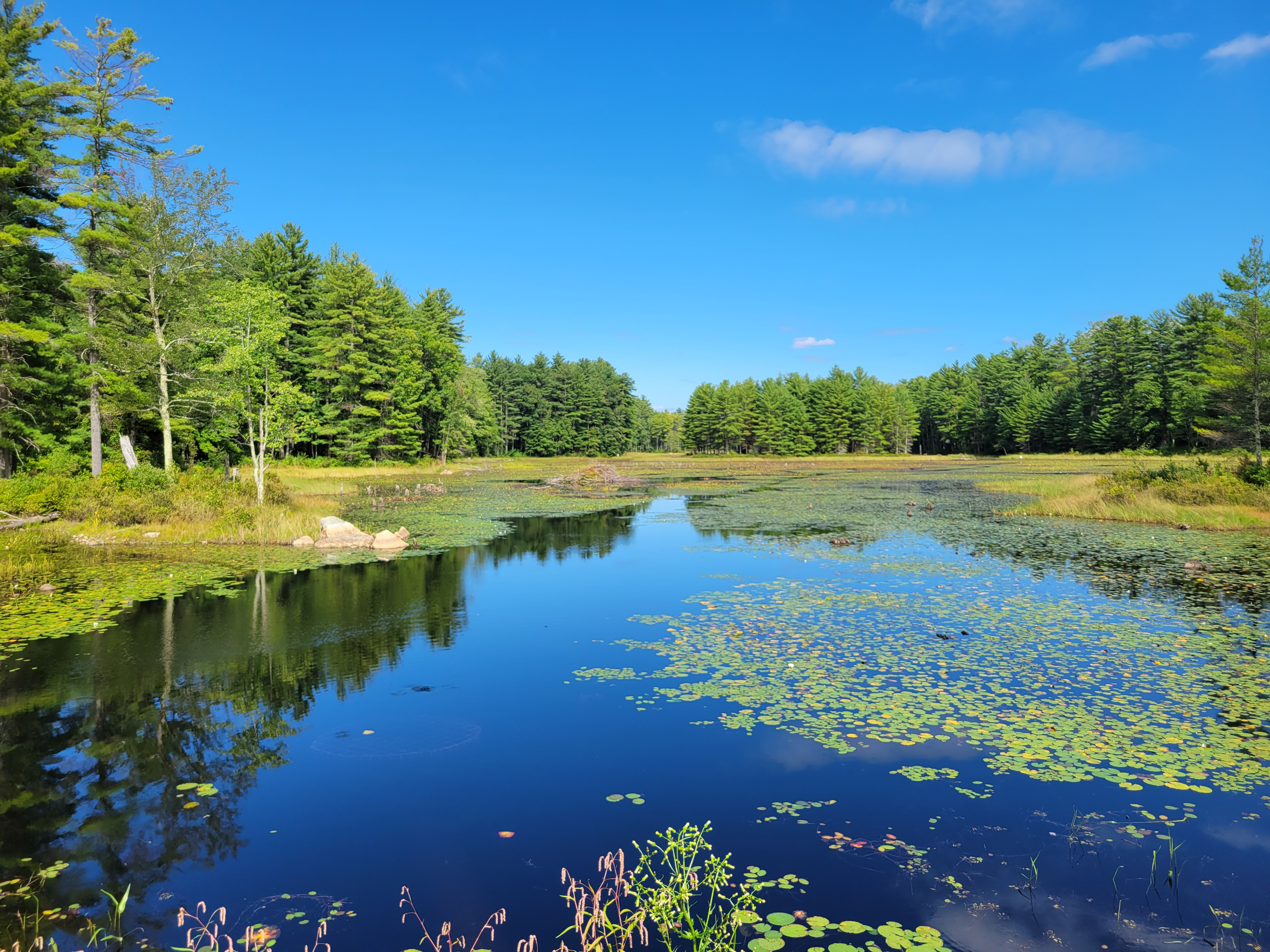
Wildlife Pond

The Beaver Brook Association is a non-profit nature center that includes a 4,000-acre (1,600 ha) conservation area in Hollis, Brookline, and Milford, New Hampshire, United States. It takes its name from Beaver Brook, a tributary of the Nissitissit River and Nashua River.

== Geography ==
The conservation area contains about 40 miles (64 km) of trails going through an area located between Northern hardwood forests and southern Northeastern coastal forests. It contains a large amount of wetland areas which run along the brook.

== History ==
The Beaver Brook Association was founded in 1964 on a 12-acre (4.9 ha) lot by Hollis P. Nichols and Jeffrey P. Smith.

== Activities ==
The mission of Beaver Brook Association is "to promote an understanding of the interrelationships in the natural world and to demonstrate natural resource stewardship." The association runs activities year round, including nature and fitness hikes, herb and gardening classes, survival skills, orienteering, snowshoeing, mindfulness in nature, forest ecology classes and more. They offer week long sessions of summer nature camps. In addition, environmental education programs are offered at schools, libraries, clubs and other public forums. Over 10,000 people attend these programs each year. The association often sponsors educational events on its campus as well as at nearby museums, schools and libraries. It has pollinator plots, a compost education court, a group campsite with cabins and fire circles, multiple historic buildings for classrooms and meeting spaces plus 14 theme gardens maintained by volunteers. Nearly 200 volunteers a year assist Beaver Brook with its mission. The nature center is open from sunrise to sunset everyday of the year.
