= Beaver Brook (Mohawk River tributary) =

Location
- Country: United States
- State: New York

Physical characteristics
- Mouth: Mohawk River
  - location: Herkimer, New York
  - coordinates: 43°01′11″N 74°55′13″W
  - elevation: 360 ft (110 m)
- Basin size: 5.12 mi^{2} (13.3 km^{2})

Beaver Brook flows into the Mohawk River near Herkimer, New York.
