= Beaver Creek (Kenai, Alaska) =

River in Alaska, United States

Coordinates: 60°32′22″N 151°08′47″W

Beaver Creek (Dena'ina: Hkayitnu) is a stream located on the western portion of the Kenai Peninsula in the U.S. state of Alaska. Beaver Creek flows approximately 10 miles from its source at Beaver Lake in the Kenai National Wildlife Refuge to the Kenai River, approximately 4 river miles from the mouth of that river in the City of Kenai at Cook Inlet. The Dena'ina call the creek Hkayitnu, meaning "Tail River". Beaver Creek was the common name added to the USGS Geographic Names Information System in 1951.

== Recreation ==
Beaver Creek shares the Kenai National Wildlife Refuge (KNWR) with the Swanson River, which has a well known canoe system. Although Beaver Creek is not part of the Swanson River canoe system due to limited access and difficult passage. Approximately 16,000 years ago the Swanson River flowed south through what is now Beaver Creek.
