= Battle of Birch Coulee =

Siege during U.S.–Dakota War of 1862

- Part of the Dakota War of 1862, American Civil War
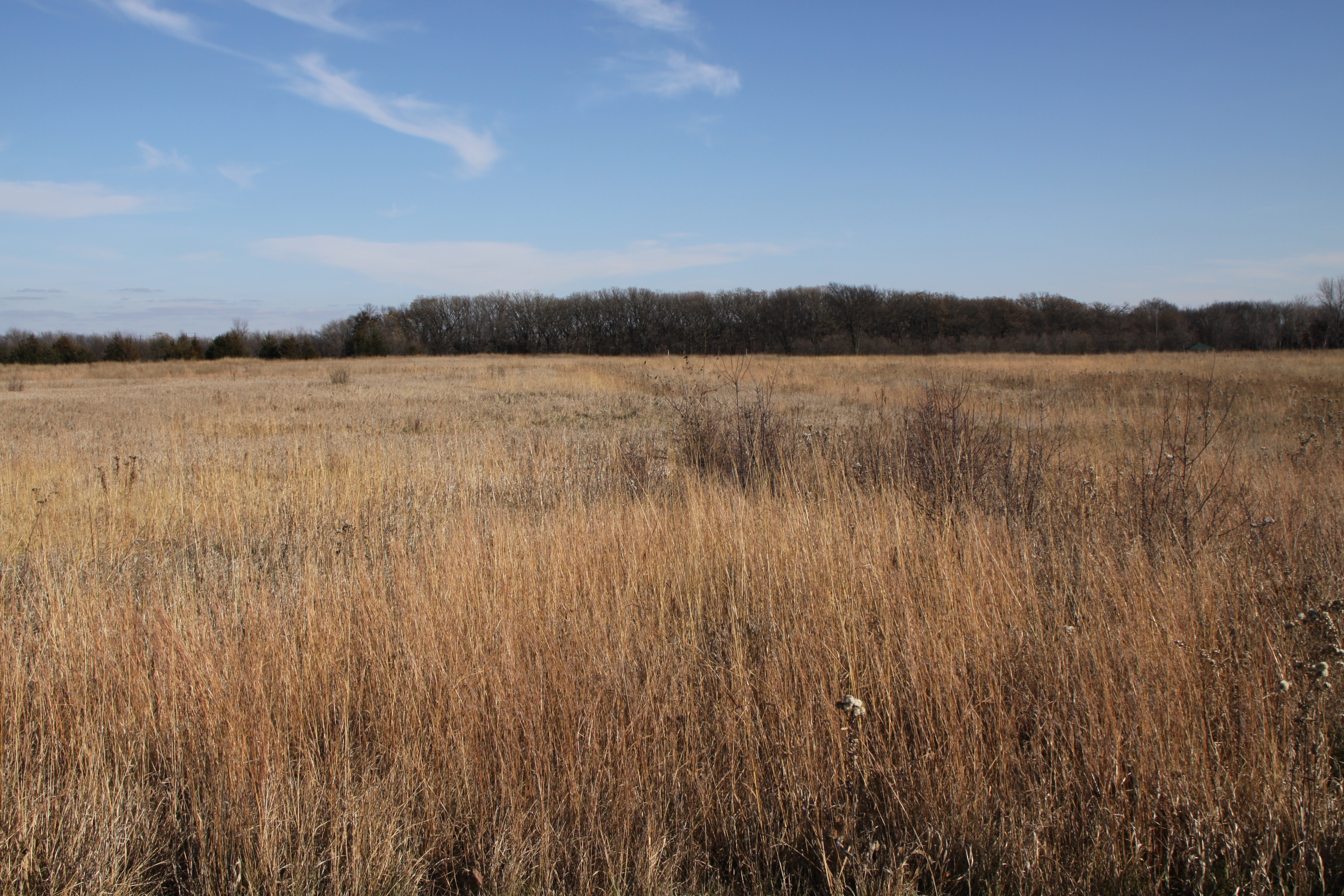
- Battlefield in 2010
Date	September 2–3, 1862
Location	Morton, Renville County, Minnesota 44°34′35″N 94°58′29″W
Result	Santee Sioux victory

Belligerents
United States	Santee Sioux

Commanders and leaders
Captain Hiram P. Grant; Captain Joseph Anderson; Major Joseph R. Brown	Gray Bird; Mankato; Big Eagle; Red Legs

Units involved
Company A, 6th Minnesota Infantry Regiment; Cullen Frontier Guards	Big Eagle's Band; Mankato's Band; Gray Bird's Band; Red Legs' Band

Strength
~150	~200

Casualties and losses
13 killed 47 wounded 90+ horses killed	2 killed Unknown number wounded

The Battle of Birch Coulee occurred on September 2–3, 1862, and resulted in the heaviest casualties suffered by U.S. forces during the Dakota War of 1862. The battle occurred after a group of Dakota warriors followed a U.S. burial expedition, including volunteer infantry, mounted guards and civilians, to an exposed plain where they were setting up camp. That night, 200 Dakota soldiers surrounded the camp and ambushed the Birch Coulee campsite in the early morning, commencing a siege that lasted for over 30 hours, until the arrival of reinforcements and artillery led by Colonel Henry Hastings Sibley.

== Background ==
After the Battle of Fort Ridgely and the Battle of New Ulm, Colonel Henry Hastings Sibley was planning to retaliate against Little Crow and the belligerent Dakota and obtain the release of the settlers they were holding captive. While Sibley was training his inexperienced soldiers and struggling to procure arms, family and friends of settlers who had been killed reminded him that their bodies remained unburied. On August 29, Sibley sent two scouts north who reported back that the Dakota were camped well north of the Yellow Medicine River, near the missions. Sibley concluded that it was safe to send an expedition to bury the dead at the Lower Sioux Agency and near Beaver Creek and Birch Coulee, and ascertain what had happened to Colonel John S. Marsh and his soldiers on August 18. He sent a burial party of 153 men from Fort Ridgely on August 31, 1862.

On the evening of August 31, warriors in Little Crow's camp were divided about what course to follow. Mdewakanton scouts had reported sighting more troops arriving at Fort Ridgely. After a heated debate, the decision was made to split into two groups. Over 100 men followed Taoyateduta Little Crow and Walker Among Sacred Stones (Tukanmani) into the "Big Woods" west of Hutchinson, where they planned to hit Cedar Mills for flour and disrupt Sibley's supply trains heading to Fort Ridgely. Meanwhile, Gray Bird (Zitkahtahhota), Mankato, Big Eagle (Wamditanka) and others would lead more than 200 soldiers, plus many women and wagons, south along the river with the objective of collecting plunder left behind in Little Crow's village and in New Ulm, which had been abandoned.

=== The burial detail ===
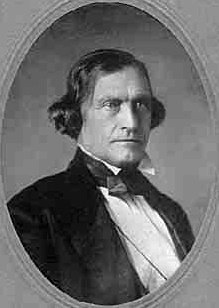
Major Joseph R. Brown

On August 31, Sibley sent two militia units along with 17 teamsters from Fort Ridgely who would bury the dead: Company A of the 6th Minnesota Volunteer Infantry Regiment commanded by Captain Hiram P. Grant, and Company A of the Cullen Frontier Guards, including 70 mounted men under Captain Joseph Anderson. They were accompanied by approximately 20 civilians who had asked to join the burial party, including former Indian agent Major Joseph R. Brown, who would be able to lend his expertise in the Dakota "character and country." Brown himself was looking for his wife and children, unaware that they were alive and safe in the "friendly" Dakota camp with Gabriel Renville (Ti'wakan) after being rescued by Akipa on August 23.

Symptomatic of the challenges in coordinating the volunteer militia, the question of whether Grant or Brown was actually in command of the expedition became a topic of major controversy in the disastrous aftermath of the battle, continuing among historians today. (See "Aftermath" below.) Written accounts by Grant and a member of the burial party, Robert K. Boyd, make it clear that Captain Grant believed he was in command and that Major Brown was merely in an advisory capacity. Captain Anderson, on the other hand, was told from the start that the commander of the expedition was Major Joseph R. Brown, and later insisted he never took a single order from Grant.

=== The burial expedition ===
On the first day, the combined forces left Fort Ridgely in the direction of the Lower Sioux Agency. After about four miles, they stopped at a farmhouse in the vicinity of Redwood Ferry where a doctor and others had been killed. Finding dozens of bodies on both sides of the road, they buried an estimated 28 victims.

On the second day, after burying more bodies near the log house, the company split up. Grant's group went north into the Beaver Creek region and buried 30 more bodies, many of which were severely decomposed. They also found a wounded survivor, Justina Kreiger, who had been shot in the back.

Brown and Anderson's group headed for the Lower Sioux Agency. On the way, they found and buried many bodies along the side of the road, including Captain John S. Marsh's men and some civilians. After crossing the river by horse and ferry and receiving the "all clear" from several skirmishers who had gone ahead, the group advanced up the hill and entered the ruins of the agency, where they stopped to bury more bodies. Brown and Anderson then left ahead of the group to reconnoiter Little Crow's abandoned village, where Brown stopped Anderson from burning down Little Crow's house. By the end of the day, the group had buried at least 17 bodies; several civilians returned to the fort after burying their relatives.

=== Campsite at Birch Coulee ===
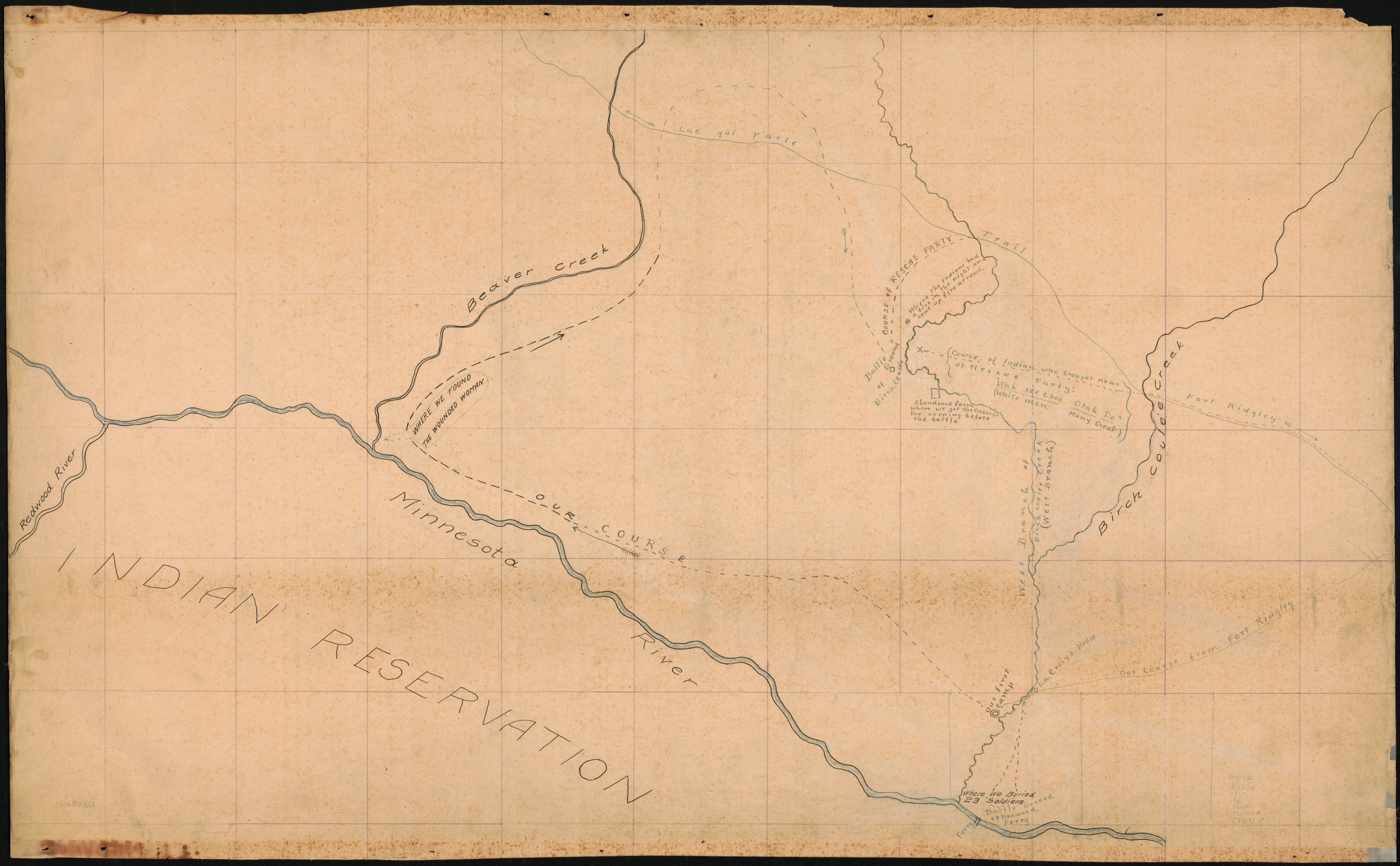
Historical map of Battle of Birch Coulee, by survivor Robert K. Boyd

After dark on the evening of September 1, Captain Grant set up camp "on the prairie near a narrow valley known as Birch Coulee." Major Brown and Captain Anderson and their men joined the camp soon afterwards. The two detachments had buried more than 75 bodies without encountering any Dakota. According to Boyd, "No Indians had been seen although our officers had made diligent search for them across the prairie with their field glasses. Major Brown did not think there were any Indians in that vicinity, and at this camp assured the men that they were just as safe as if they were in their own homes."

Little thought was given to the location of the campsite, which was on an exposed plain near the coulee, which was covered heavily with trees and tall grass. Also, since most of the burial detail felt themselves safe, they failed to take precautions against attack such as digging entrenchments and posting sentries far enough from camp to give ample warning.

Instead, the men placed their 20 wagons in a horseshoe shape and tied them together with ropes, enclosing about one-half acre of land. The horses were left to graze in the open part of the corral on the east side, about 200 yards west of the coulee. Tents were pitched inside the corral, guards were posted just outside the wagons, and the men in the company went to sleep. One of Anderson's men, mixed-blood soldier Joseph Coursolle (Hinhankaga), later recounted, "We were dog tired, but in spite of 'Major' Brown's assurance, many of us, mostly those with Sioux blood, dug shallow holes to lie in. These little holes saved the lives of many!"

Meanwhile, the Dakota party including Gray Bird, Mankato, Big Eagle and Red Legs and more than 200 men had reached the Lower Sioux Agency in the afternoon. Upon reaching Little Crow's village, the men in advance had seen a column of mounted men and wagons to the north, moving east; they also saw signs that "white men" had been there a few hours prior, and sent four or five scouts to follow them, "creeping across the prairie like so many ants." After sundown, they received word that Brown's men had set up camp at the head of Birch Coulee. Big Eagle later recalled: "At the time, we did not know there were two companies there. We thought the company of mounted men was all, and that there were not more than 75 men."

The leaders of the group agreed that the Birch Coulee campsite was an easy target and planned an attack in the early morning.

== Battle ==
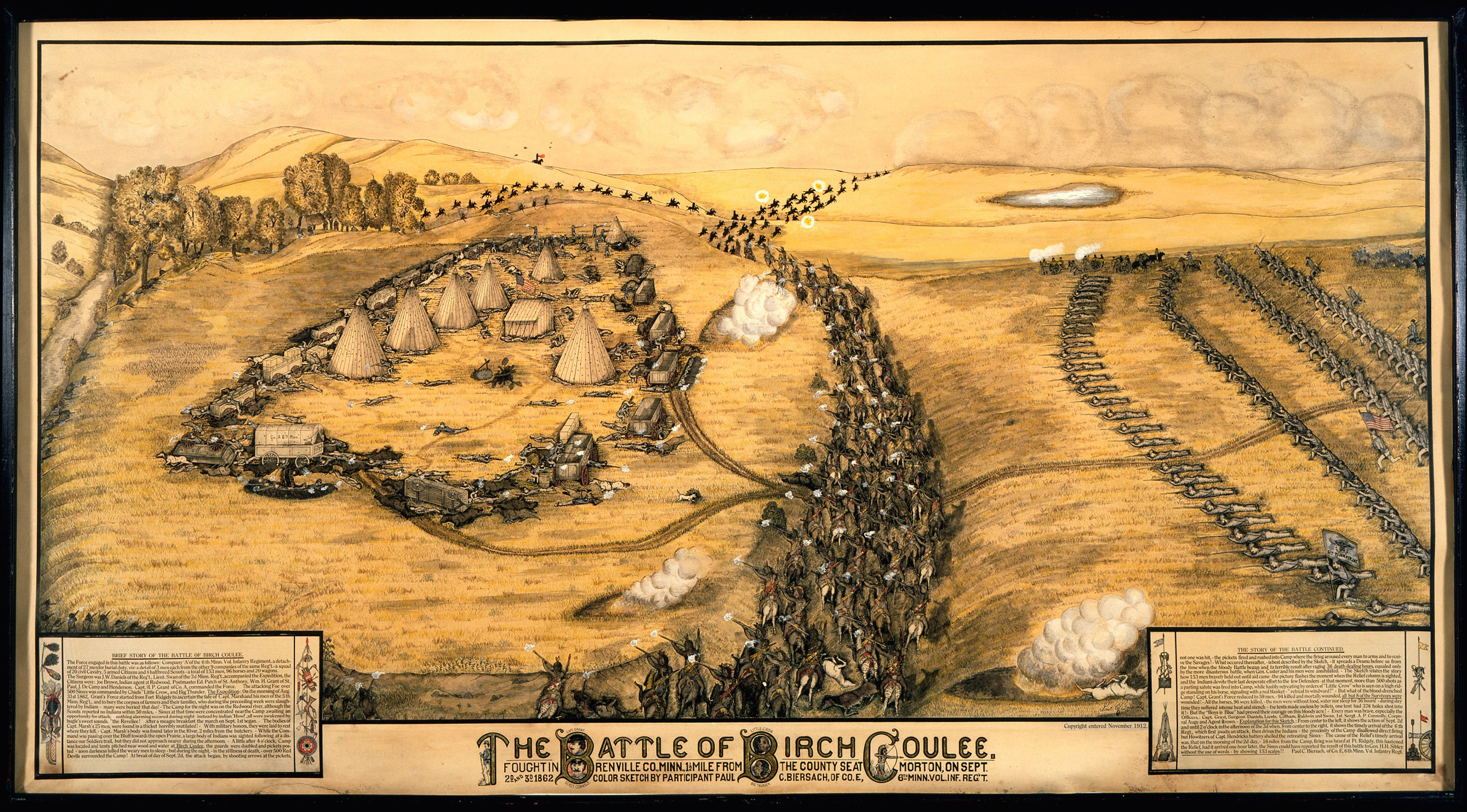
Lithograph depicting the Battle of Birch Coulee

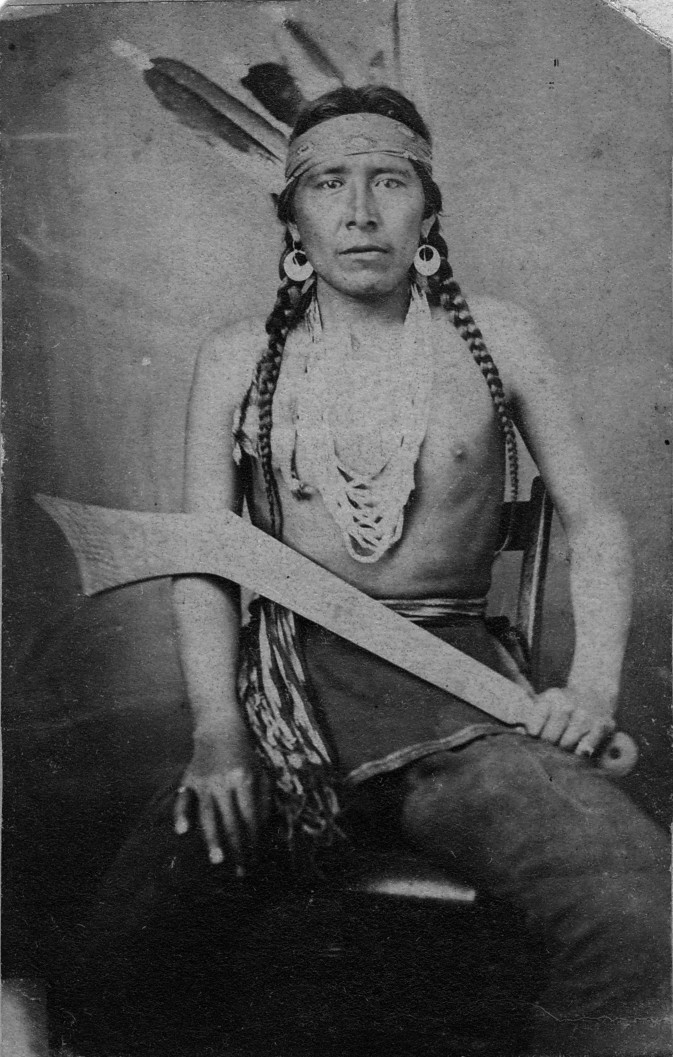
Big Eagle was later pardoned by President Abraham Lincoln

=== The ambush ===
During the night, Gray Bird, along with chiefs Red Legs, Big Eagle, and Mankato crossed the Minnesota River and surrounded the camp.

Big Eagle recounted: "We felt sure we could capture it, and that 200 men would be enough for the undertaking... I had about thirty men. Nearly all the Indians had double-barreled shotguns, and we loaded them with buckshot and large bullets called 'trader's balls.' After dark we started, crossed the river and valley, went up the bluffs and on the prairie, and soon we saw the white tents and the wagons of the camp. We had no difficulty in surrounding the camp. The pickets were only a little way from it. I led my men up from the west through the grass and took up a position 200 yards from the camp, behind a small knoll or elevation. Red Legs took his men into the coulie east of the camp. Mankato ('Blue Earth') had some of his men in the coulie and some on the prairie. Gray Bird and his men were mostly on the prairie."

At 4:30 in the morning on September 2, one of the guards at the Birch Coulee campsite saw two figures crawling through the grass and fired. The Dakota commenced their ambush immediately, killing at least a dozen men, wounding thirty, and killing most of their horses within the first few minutes.

Many of Grant's soldiers were wounded or killed as they sprung awake and left their tents in shock and confusion, looking for cover. The soldiers had, however, gone to sleep with their muskets loaded, and many were able to return fire, crouching behind the fallen horses they used as barricades, and driving back the Dakota warriors who approached the wagons.

While most horses were hit by the first volley, a few broke loose and galloped wildly in terror. Soon, only one horse was left alive in the campsite. Coursolle recalled, "The unscathed horse seemed to have a charmed life and we clung to a faint hope that somebody might mount him and dash through the besieging braves to summon relief from Fort Ridgely. But the Indians concentrated their fire and finally the poor beast crumpled and fell." According to Big Eagle, one horse was captured by Buffalo Ghost.

At least two men in the campsite completely panicked, ran out and were shot down by the Dakota, including Peter Boyer, one of Anderson's "mixed-blood" mounted guards whom he later accused of deserting, and Jonathan Henderson, a settler who had buried his wife and children the day before.

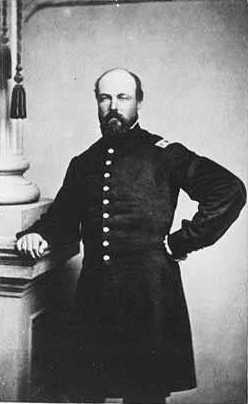
Captain Joseph Anderson led the Cullen Frontier Guards

To the alarm of Dr. Jared W. Daniels, Captain Grant himself was heard shouting, "We all shall be scalped!" The infantry in particular was young and inexperienced. Robert K. Boyd, who was seventeen years old himself at the time, wrote, "It should be considered that our men were new recruits, nearly all ignorant as to the use of arms and carrying army rifles which were strange to them; not one of the guns ever having been fired at a target. Not over three shots had been fired by any one of our infantry force, and even these shots were not aimed at any definite object or target." Captain Anderson, on the other hand, was described by another soldier as "cool and unconcerned as an iceberg" as he took charge of the defense. Major Brown had taken a ball in the side of his neck and was treated by Dr. Daniels, the former government physician at the Upper Sioux Agency, who also tended to the other wounded.

=== The siege ===
The heaviest part of the fight at Birch Coulee lasted about an hour, but the siege would continue well into the next day.

As the sun rose, many of the men – including "mixed-blood" traders Alexander Faribault and Jack Frazer, and soldiers including Private A.P. Connolly – used bayonets, knives, tin plates and the four shovels they had to dig rifle pits and settle in for a long siege.

As the siege dragged on, both sides resorted to conserving ammunition and fired only occasionally over the course of the day. Brown's men had to ration what little water and food they had as they suffered in the hot sun. Captain Anderson later reported, "The men fought throughout the whole engagement without water and provisions except 1/4 of a hard cracker to each man and about 1 ounce of raw cabbage to a man, and joked each other freely in regard to their 'heavy' diet."

In contrast, the Dakota warriors were situated comfortably. As Big Eagle explained, "We had an easy time of it. We could crawl through the grass and into the coulie and get water when we wanted it, and after a few hours our women crossed the river and came up near the bluff and cooked for us, and we could go back and eat and then return to the fight. We did not lose many men. Indeed, I only saw two dead Indians, and I never heard that any more were killed."

By mid-afternoon, many Dakota warriors grew impatient at the slow pace of the fight and started to plan a charge. The fluent Dakota speakers among Brown's troops could hear the warriors planning their assault. Big Eagle heard the trader Alex Faribault call out in Dakota, "You do very wrong to fire on us. We did not come out to fight; we only came out to bury the bodies of the white people you killed." In another exchange, Joseph Coursolle heard one of the Dakota warriors call out, "Hear me, Hinhankaga. We saw you shoot. You killed the son of Chief Traveling Hail. Now we kill your little girls!" Coursolle was filled with emotion upon hearing that his two daughters might still be alive, but a few moments later, another soldier a few feet away was shot in the head and killed instantly.

Toward evening, one of the Dakota men approached the campsite waving a white flag. Captain Grant sent one of the "mixed-blood" soldiers, Corporal James Auge, out to speak to the messenger and translate. The message was that the Dakota warriors had reinforcements in place and planned to kill every soldier, but did not want to kill any "half-breeds". Grant asked Auge to find out if any mixed-blood members of the party wanted to leave. They all declined. Captain Grant then instructed Auge to tell the Dakota that they had two hundred men, each with two rifles loaded, and that the messenger should leave with his flag of truce. According to Private Connolly, Grant was playing "a game of bluff, for at that time we only had about sixty-five effective men, and were nearly out of ammunition." After Auge delivered the message, Captain Grant gave the order to fire; the messenger escaped, but the horse was struck.

=== Reinforcements ===
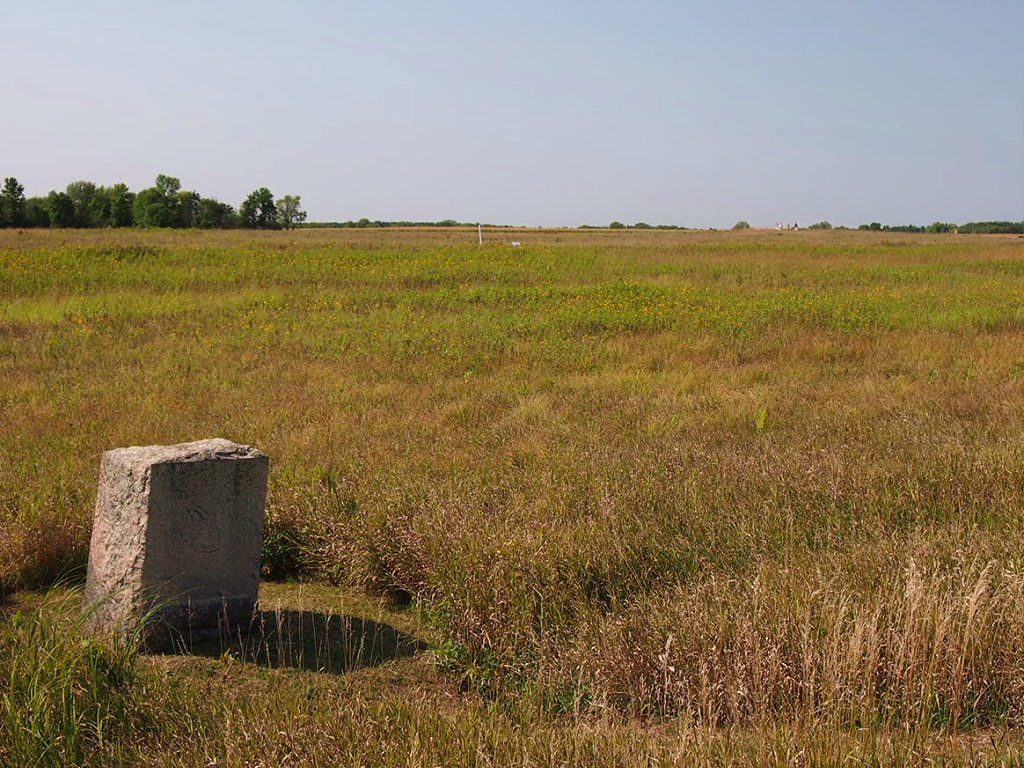
Birch Coulee battlefield (2012)

Back at Fort Ridgely, which was about sixteen miles away, Colonel Sibley had been alerted to the sound of gunfire coming from Birch Coulee, and sent out a relief party of 240 soldiers with two six-pounder guns. The relief party, led by Colonel Samuel McPhail and Lieutenant Timothy J. Sheehan, "was composed of Companies B, D, and E of the 6th Minnesota, 50 mounted rangers, and a section of artillery." However, much to the dismay of Brown's men, Colonel McPhail led his men to the opposite side of the ravine but stopped because he thought he was almost completely surrounded by the Sioux, and sent one of his lieutenants through a gauntlet of hostile Dakota, back to the fort for more reinforcements.

In fact, the Dakota warriors had been preparing to rush the camp, but once they saw the large number of mounted soldiers, they stopped the charge. Big Eagle recounted: "Mankato at once took some men from the coulie and went out to meet them. He told me he did not take more than fifty, but he scattered them out and they all yelled and made such a noise that the whites must have thought there were a great many more, and they stopped on the prairie and began fighting. They had a cannon and used it, but it did no harm... Mankato flourished his men around so, and all the Indians in the coulie kept up a noise, and at last the whites began to fall back, and they retreated about two miles and began to dig breastworks."

Big Eagle continued: "Mankato followed them and left about thirty men to watch them, and returned to the fight at the Coulie with the rest. The Indians were laughing when they came back at the way they had deceived the white men, and we were all glad that the whites had not pushed forward and driven us away....When the men of this force began to fall back the whites in the camp hallooed and made a great commotion, as if they were begging them to return and relieve them and seemed much distressed that they did not."

Captain Grant speculated that on the night of the September 2, the Dakota forces were "reinforced by about five hundred warriors" – a claim dismissed by Big Eagle. On the topic of Dakota reinforcements, Big Eagle stated: "Late in the day some of the men who had been left in the villages came over on their horses to see what the trouble was that the camp had not been taken, and they rode about the prairie for a time, but I do not think many of them got into the fight. I do not remember that we got many reinforcements that day. If we got any, they must have come up the coulee and I did not see them. Perhaps some horsemen came up on the east side of the coulee, but I knew nothing about it. I am sure no reinforcements came to me. I did not need any. Our circle about the camp was rather small and we could only use a certain number of men."

=== Arrival of artillery ===
Finally on the morning of September 3, 1862, Sibley arrived at Birch Coulee with a massive infantry force and artillery, including the remaining six companies of the 6th Minnesota, bolstered by the arrival of Lieutenant Colonel William Rainey Marshall and two companies of the 7th Minnesota Infantry Regiment at Fort Ridgely. The shelling forced the Dakota to disperse, and Sibley entered Brown's camp around 11am on September 3. He encountered a "sickening sight," with 13 soldiers dead on the ground, over 90 horses dead, and 47 men severely wounded. (Five men died later of their wounds. Grant wrote many years later that a total of 22 men were killed at Birch Coulee, suggesting that there were also civilian deaths not counted toward the militia totals.) The survivors, finally relieved from duty at 12 noon, were exhausted from a thirty-one hour siege without water, rest or food.

== Aftermath ==
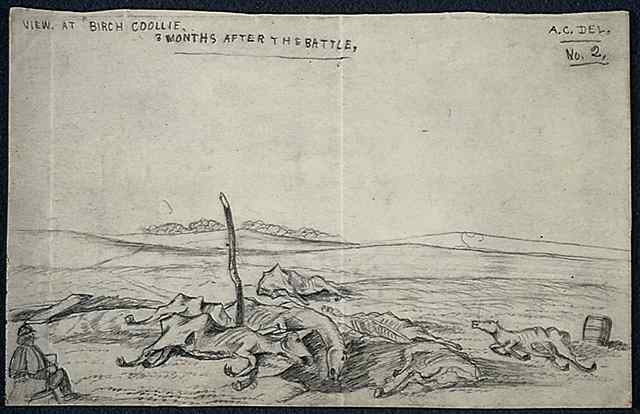
Aftermath at Birch Coulee battlefield

The Battle of Birch Coulee was the most deadly for the United States forces in the Dakota War of 1862. To many observers in the U.S., it exposed the danger of moving into hostile territory while relying on too few untrained troops. Ironically, the battle could have been even deadlier if Little Crow and his men had joined the war party that had headed south. Instead, during the Battle of Birch Coulee, the Dakota soldiers following Little Crow and Tukanmani divided up and attacked Hutchinson and Forest City, burning the towns down.

=== Pressure on Sibley ===
Colonel Sibley was stunned by the carnage and was devastated at the loss of so many horses. The loss of all the horses on the Birch Coulee campsite, combined with mounts lost by Colonel McPhail, "literally destroyed Sibley's precious little cavalry." By September 13, after his remaining cavalry had left for home, Sibley would be left with only 25 mounted men.

Following the disaster at Birch Coulee, Sibley wrote to Governor Alexander Ramsey asking to be relieved, but the governor refused and instead ordered Sibley to attack the Dakota more forcefully. Frustrated at the lack of trained soldiers, horses and ammunition available to him, Sibley feared another ambush and was cautious about acting prematurely; he was also conscious that any mistake he made could result in the slaying of the prisoners.

As panic set in within eastern Minnesota, angry newspaper editors accused Sibley of incompetence, expressing frustration that he had underestimated the ruthlessness of the belligerent Sioux and was overly cautious. Referring derisively to the burial party at Birch Coulee, St. Cloud newspaper publisher Jane Swisshelm wrote in a scathing letter to Governor Ramsey: "For God's Sake put some live person in command of the force against the Sioux as Col. Sibley has 100 men or thereabouts in his undertaker's corps." Some suggested that Sibley was hesitating because of his personal and business connections with many Dakota. On his part, Ramsey made repeated pleas to Washington, the war department, and the governors of other states for assistance, but found it difficult to compete with the demands of the Union Army which also needed more troops for the Civil War.

=== Divisions between "hostile" and "friendly" Dakota camps ===
On the Dakota side, the Battle of Birch Coulee and the Big Woods raids led by Little Crow and Tukanmani on Forest City and Hutchinson strengthened the hostile Mdewakantons' belief that they could defeat the whites. However, the events only seemed to strengthen the resolve of the "friendly" camp of Sisseton and Wahpeton bands to oppose the conflict, resist joining forces with Little Crow's camp, and demand the release of the women and children held prisoner by the hostiles.

After the Battle of Birch Coulee, the "hostile" camp invited the "friendly" camp to a large council, with nearly a thousand people in attendance. During the council, warriors who had fought in the battle spoke about their experience, and several mentioned that they had recognized the voice of Major Joseph R. Brown. Wanting to find out whether their brother-in-law Brown was still alive, Gabriel Renville (Tiwakan) suggested sending his half-brother Charles Renville Crawford (Wakanhinape) out to the Birch Coulee battlefield to investigate how many of Sibley's men had been killed. It was Charles Crawford who reported back that he had found a letter from Colonel Henry H. Sibley.

=== Communications between Sibley and Little Crow ===
One of the most significant developments connected with Birch Coulee was that Colonel Sibley left a message for Little Crow – enclosed in a cigar box and attached to a stake in the ground – on the battlefield afterwards, knowing it was likely to be found. In his letter, Sibley wrote, "If Little Crow has any propositions to make, let him send a half-breed to me, and he shall be protected in and out of my camp," opening a series of communications between Sibley and Little Crow (and, unbeknownst to Little Crow, between Sibley and a few disgruntled Mdewakanton chiefs). In his subsequent letters, Sibley urged the release of the prisoners as a prerequisite for any negotiations – a condition Little Crow was unwilling to accept.

The exchange of messages allowed both Sibley and Little Crow to gather intelligence about each other from the messengers. As Little Crow and his soldiers' lodge learned that Sibley's army was growing in number and would likely start marching soon, they broke up camp on September 9 to move further north, only to be repelled by Red Iron, who refused to let them pass. On September 19, Sibley finally departed Fort Ridgely with his entire army of 1,619 men, heading in the direction of Yellow Medicine. The two sides would clash in the decisive Battle of Wood Lake on September 23, 1862.

=== Controversy over command ===
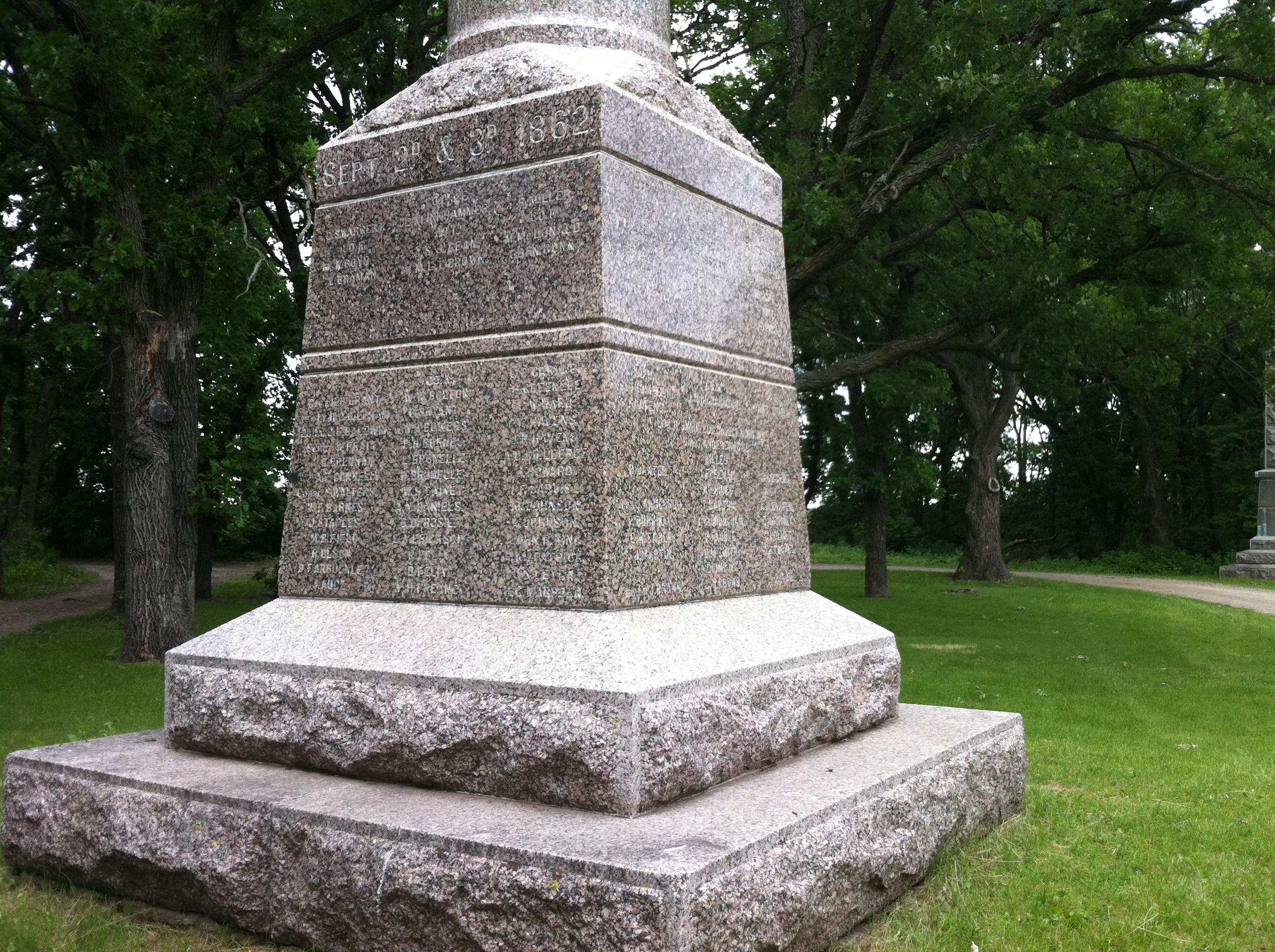
Birch Coulee State Monument in 2011

The controversy over who was "actually" in command over the Minnesota burial operation was ignited on September 4, 1862, when Captain Grant tried to submit his report about the expedition and battle to Colonel Sibley, only to be rebuffed by Sibley who "coolly" told him to report to his commanding officer, Brown. Grant promptly destroyed his original report. On the same day, Captain Anderson presented his report on the battle to Major Joseph R. Brown as "Commander of the Expedition," and deliberately left out any mention of Grant. On the other hand, Colonel McPhail, who led the advance troops of the relief party, wrote in his report to Sibley on September 5, 1862, that he had "proceeded to the relief of Captain Grant's command."

Colonel Sibley himself referred to the battle in military reports and in the press as "the attack on J.R. Brown's party," writing, "That the command was not destroyed before I arrived to rescue them from their perilous situation may be ascribed chiefly to the coolness and nerve displayed by Major Brown and Captain Anderson, both of whom were severely wounded." Historians such as Gary Clayton Anderson have suggested that Sibley was incensed when he heard about Grant's conduct during the battle – particularly when he panicked during the ambush – and that this explains his subsequent behavior toward Grant. Others have speculated that Sibley's rebuke was due to Grant's poor choice of campsite. Still others have suggested that Sibley was trying to shift the blame for the carnage to Brown's lack of experience as a military commander, rather than taking responsibility himself.

Humiliated, Captain Grant appears to have spent the rest of his life trying to set the record straight. In his narrative of the war from a Dakota point of view published on July 1, 1894, in the St. Paul Pioneer Press, Big Eagle (who had been sentenced to death but received a pardon from President Abraham Lincoln) said, "Some years ago I saw Capt. Grant in St. Paul and he told me he was in command of the camp at Birch Coulie."

The Birch Coulee Battlefield is listed on the U.S. National Register of Historic Places. The Birch Coulee State Monument, located two miles south of the battlefield, states that Captain Hiram P. Grant was in command.

== Units ==
=== Sixth Minnesota Volunteer Infantry Regiment ===
Captain Hiram P. Grant led Company A of the 6th Minnesota Infantry Regiment at the Battle of Birch Coulee, plus members of other companies of the 6th.

Casualties (Company A):

- Killed: Sergeants John College; William Irvine; Corporal William M. Cobb; Privates Cornelius Coyle; George Coulter; Chauncey L. King; Henry Rolleau; William Russell; Henry Whetsler;
- Wounds: Corp. S. Carbuckle, G.W. Eagles, E. Brown, E.S. Blase, S. Fielding, S. Hapt, A. Hayford, D.G. House, C. Mayall, D.H. McCauley, W.A. Newcomb, F.C. Shanley, C.W. Smith, W. Vayhinger, S.J. Weiting.

Casualties (Company G):

- Killed: Sergeant Benjamin S. Terry; Corporal F.C.W. Renneken;
- Wounds: S. Clark, T. Barnes, B. Viles.

=== Cullen Frontier Guards ===
Captain Joseph Anderson of Company A of the "Cullen Frontier Guards," designated in their muster roll as Company A of the First Minnesota Mounted Regiment of the Irregular Volunteer Militia, was at the Battle of Birch Coulee.

Casualties:

- Killed: 2nd Sergeant Robert Baxter; Private Jacob Freeman;
- Died of Wounds: Private Richard Gibbons; Joseph Warren DeCamp;
- Wounds: Captain Joseph Anderson {wounded in upper left arm and left foot}; Farrier Thomas Barton {dangerously wounded}; Privates A.H. Bunker {wounded through both arms}; Peter Burkman {wounded in both thighs and ruptured}; James Buckingham {wounded through the left shoulder}; George Dashney {wounded in the right thigh}; John Martin.

=== Dakota Forces ===
Four bands of Dakota warriors, mainly Mdewakanton and Wahpekute, were at the Battle of Birch Coulee, led by Gray Bird, Mankato, Big Eagle and Red Legs.

Casualties:

- Killed: Thunder Voice (Hotonna, brother of Red Legs); unknown Sisseton warrior, also with Red Legs's Wahpekute band.
