= Little Beaver Creek (disambiguation) =

Little Beaver Creek may refer to the following creeks:

- Little Beaver Creek, a tributary of the Ohio River
- Little Beaver Creek (Missouri)
- Little Beaver Creek (Fisher River tributary), a stream in Surry County, North Carolina
- Little Beaver Creek (Lorain County, Ohio)
