= Beaver Creek Provincial Park =

Provincial park in British Columbia, Canada

- IUCN category II (national park)
- Location within British Columbia
- Interactive map of Beaver Creek Provincial Park
- Location: Kootenay Boundary, British Columbia, California
- Coordinates: 49°03′47″N 117°36′44″W
- Area: 81 ha (200 acres)
- Designation: Class C Provincial Park
- Established: March 24, 1965
- Governing body: BC Parks

Beaver Creek Provincial Park is a Class C provincial park in the Regional District of Kootenay Boundary in British Columbia, Canada. It is located on the west shore of Washow Bay, which is on Lake Winnipeg. The park itself is a two-kilometer long stretch of land. Beaver Creek is two miles south of Trail, using the Old Waneta Road/Highway 22A. The nearby communities are Trail, Fruitvale, Castlegar, and Montrose.

== Recreation ==
Beaver Creek Park has 10 rustic campsites available, and is a popular location for fishing. Some of the camping sites have a view of the lake, and all of the sites are open on a first-come, first-serve basis, though reservations can be made ahead of time. There is a boat launch available.
