= Beaver Creek (Rock Creek tributary) =

Stream in Idaho, U.S.

Coordinates: 44°06′25″N 111°08′28″W

Beaver Creek is a stream in the U.S. state of Idaho. It is a tributary of Rock Creek.

Beaver Creek was named for the abundance of beavers in the creek.
