= Beaver Creek (Yellow River tributary) =

Stream in Wisconsin, U.S.

Beaver Creek is a stream in the U.S. state of Wisconsin. It is a tributary to the Yellow River.

The stream headwaters arise just southwest of the Marshfield municipal airport at 44°37′52″N 90°12′55″W at an elevation of 1320 feet. The stream flows south-southeast passing under U.S. Route 10 and Wisconsin Highway 13 before turning to the southwest to enter the Yellow River approximately 3.5 miles south of its origin at 44°35′03″N 90°11′32″W and an elevation of 1152 feet.

Beaver Creek was so named for the beavers along its course.
