= Beaver Creek (Piney River tributary) =

Stream in Hickman County, Tennessee, U.S.

Coordinates: 35°55′25″N 87°28′22″W

Beaver Creek is a stream in Hickman County, Tennessee, in the United States. It is a tributary of Piney River.

Beaver Creek was named for the numerous North American beavers found there by hunters.

== See also ==
- List of rivers of Tennessee
