= Beaverbrooks =

British jeweler

Beaverbrooks the Jewellers
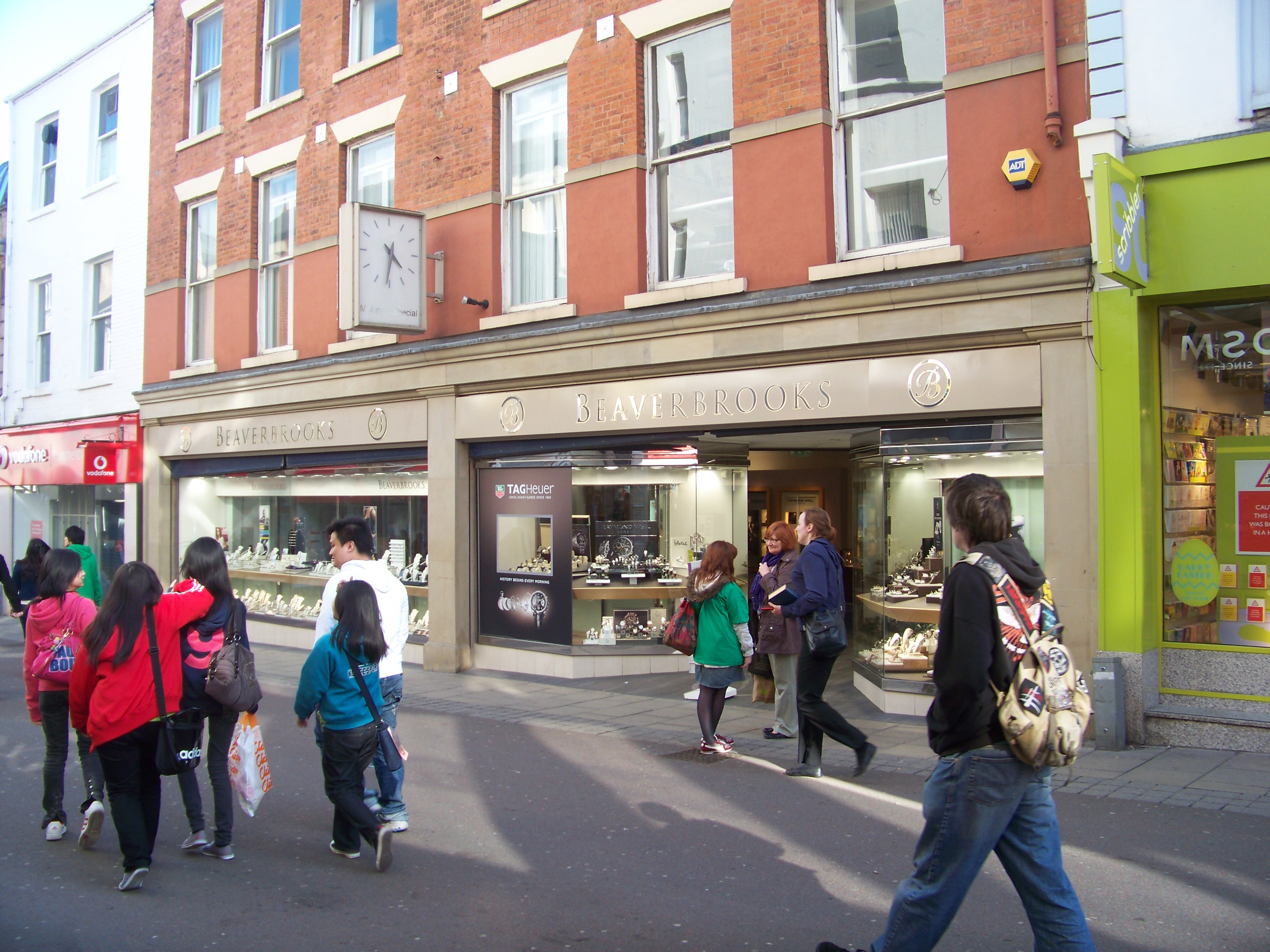
- Beaverbrooks on Commercial Street in Leeds.
- Company type: Private
- Industry: Retail
- Founded: 1919
- Founder: Isaac, Harry and Maurice Adlestone
- Headquarters: St Annes on Sea, UK
- Number of locations: 80
- Key people: Anna Blackburn - Managing Director, Mark Adlestone - Chairman
- Products: Jewellery
- Number of employees: 950
- Website: www.beaverbrooks.co.uk

Beaverbrooks is a British jeweller. Established in 1919, with the opening of its first shop in Belfast.

== Awards and recognition ==
In 2009, Beaverbrooks staff were identified as the most content in the country, according to the Sunday Times, with the company topping the newspaper's annual rankings of the ‘100 Best Companies to Work For’ in that year. They've appeared in the list for 17 consecutive years. In 2020, they were named the 9th Best Company To Work For and Best Place To Work at the Retail Week Awards.

- 1st in the Sunday Times' 'Best Companies to Work for' 2009
- Best Workplace in Europe 2008
- UK Jewellery Awards- Multiple Retailer of the Year, Retail Employer of the Year
