= Beaver Creek (Niobrara River tributary) =

Stream in Nebraska, U.S.

Beaver Creek Tributary to Niobrara River
- Location of Beaver Creek mouth Beaver Creek (Niobrara River tributary) (the United States)

Location
- Country: United States
- State: Nebraska
- County: Holt

Physical characteristics
- Source: Elkhorn River divide
  - location: about 0.5 miles west-northwest of Schmaderer School
  - coordinates: 42°40′15.00″N 099°07′20.36″W
  - elevation: 2,130 ft (650 m)
- Mouth: Niobrara River
  - location: about 4 miles south-southwest of School No. 54
  - coordinates: 42°51′8.60″N 099°06′18.35″W
  - elevation: 1,690 ft (520 m)
- Length: 17.01 mi (27.37 km)
- Basin size: 45.49 square miles (117.8 km^{2})
- Discharge
  - location: Niobrara River
  - average: 5.13 cu ft/s (0.145 m^{3}/s) at mouth with Niobrara River

Basin features
- Progression: Niobrara River → Missouri River → Mississippi
- River system: Niobrara
- Tributaries
  - left: Cedar Gulch
- Bridges: 890th Road, 468th Road, 895th Road, 896th Road, Deer Road

Beaver Creek is a 17.01 mi (27.37 km) long third-order tributary to the Niobrara River in Holt County, Nebraska.

== Course ==
Beaver Creek rises on the Elkhorn River divide about 0.5 miles (0.80 km) west-northwest of Schmaderer School in Holt County and then flows north to join the Niobrara River about 4 miles (6.4 km) south-southwest of School No. 54.

== Watershed ==
Beaver Creek drains 45.49 square miles (117.8 km^{2}) of area, receives about 24.5 in/year (62 cm/year) of precipitation, and is about 3.12% forested.

== See also ==
- List of rivers of Nebraska
