= Holmes River =

Coordinates: 53°15′10″N 120°04′13″W

The Holmes River is a tributary of the upper Fraser River in the Robson Valley region of British Columbia, Canada, entering that river southeast of the village of McBride. The river was named after Albert W. Holmes, provincial forest ranger at McBride. "Beaver River" is or was the local name, probably referring to a distinctive rock formation.

== See also ==
- List of rivers of British Columbia
