= Beaver Creek (Upper Iowa River tributary) =

Stream in Mower and Fillmore County, Minnesota, U.S.

Coordinates: 43°30′10″N 92°23′6″W

Beaver Creek is a stream in Mower and Fillmore counties, in the U.S. state of Minnesota. It is a tributary of the Upper Iowa River.

Beaver Creek was probably named for the North American beavers which inhabit the stream.

== See also ==
- List of rivers of Minnesota
