= Beaver Brook Station, New Brunswick =

Coordinates: 47°08′00″N 65°36′00″W

Location of Beaver Brook Station in New Brunswick

Beaver Brook Station is a Canadian rural community in Northumberland County, New Brunswick.

== History ==
Beaver Brook Station was created when the Intercolonial Railway was constructed through the area 15 km (9.3 mi) north of Newcastle (now part of the city of Miramichi) in 1875.

== Notable people ==
Max Aitken grew up in the nearby community of Newcastle, New Brunswick. In accepting his peerage, he chose the name "Lord Beaverbrook" (note the spelling difference) in reference to this community, after initially considering the harder to pronounce "Lord Miramichi".

== See also ==
- List of communities in New Brunswick
