= Joseph Anderson (U.S. Army captain) =

American settler (1826–1897)

Captain Joseph Anderson
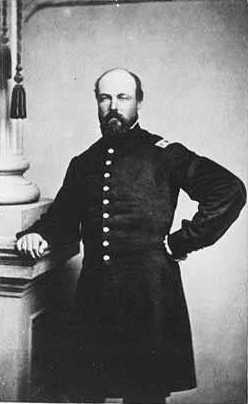
- Captain Joseph Anderson in 1863.
- Born: August 20, 1826; Steubenville, Ohio
- Died: June 23, 1879 (aged 52); Oklahoma City, Oklahoma
- Burial place: Fairlawn Cemetery, Oklahoma City, Oklahoma
- Military career
- Allegiance: United States; Minnesota
- Branch: Union Army
- Service years: 1846-1847; 1862-1863
- Rank: Captain
- Units: Cullen Frontier Guard; 1st Minnesota Cavalry Regiment
- Commands: Company A, Cullen Frontier Guard; Company G, 1st Minnesota Cavalry Regiment
- Conflicts: Mexican-American War; Dakota War of 1862; Battles of New Ulm; Battle of Birch Coulee; Sioux Wars

Joseph Anderson (August 20, 1826 – June 23, 1897) was an early settler of Minnesota, a businessman, freemason, and military officer who fought in the Mexican–American War, the Dakota War of 1862, and the Sioux Wars.

== Early life ==
Anderson was born on August 20, 1826, near Steubenville, Ohio. Anderson moved to Indiana in the 1840s and lived in Marion, Indiana. Anderson moved to the state of Wisconsin and married Martha J. Howard (1823–1920) in Racine, Wisconsin in January, 1852. Anderson moved to Minnesota Territory shortly before statehood and resided in Saint Paul, Minnesota according to his military records.

== Military career ==
During the Mexican–American War Anderson volunteered to serve in Company D of the 5th Indiana Volunteers in 1847. He was later transferred to Company H of the 5th Indiana and was discharged in July, 1848.

During the Dakota War of 1862 Anderson joined a local militia, the Cullen Frontier Guard under the command of Major William J. Cullen. Cullen was an Indian agent and the head of the Northern Superintendency of Indian Affairs before the outbreak of the conflict. The Cullen Frontier Guard was made up of frontiersmen primarily from St. Peter, Traverse des Sioux, Brown County, and the surrounding areas. Anderson was commission was the Captain of Company A of the Cullen Frontier Guard and fought at both the Battles of New Ulm and the Battle of Birch Coulee where he was severely wounded in the arm.

Following the Dakota War Anderson enlisted in the 1st Minnesota Cavalry Regiment on November 20, 1862. The 1st Minnesota Cavalry Regiment fought in the subsequent Sioux Wars under Henry Hastings Sibley and Alfred Sully against the Dakota people at the Battle of Big Mound, the Battle of Dead Buffalo Lake, and the Battle of Stony Lake. Anderson was made Captain of Company G, still referred to as the "Cullen Frontier Guards" of the 1st Minnesota Cavalry Regiment and mustered out of federal service on November 28, 1863.

== Postwar ==
Following the Dakota War and Sioux Wars Anderson served in a civilian capacity at Fort Buford in western Dakota Territory and owned a freight business and supplied hay from Saint Paul, Minnesota to Fort Buford. Anderson worked directly for Captain Charles Atchison, the Ordnance and Assistant Commissary Officer for supplies running through Dakota Territory to Fort Buford via the Sibley Trail. Anderson was a follower of Freemasonry and was a member of the Spencer Lodge No. 95 in Spencer, Indiana. He was initiated on February 1, 1850, and received his Master Mason Degree on April 4, 1850. Anderson was also a charter member of the Fort Buford-based Yellowstone Lodge No. 88 in Williams County, North Dakota.
