= Beaver Creek (Minnesota River tributary) =

Stream in Renville County, Minnesota, U.S.

Coordinates: 44°33′35″N 95°03′00″W

Beaver Creek is a stream in Renville County, in the U.S. state of Minnesota. It is a tributary of the Minnesota River.

Beaver Creek is an English translation of the native Sioux language name.

== See also ==
- List of rivers of Minnesota
