= Joseph R. Brown =

American politician (1805–1870)

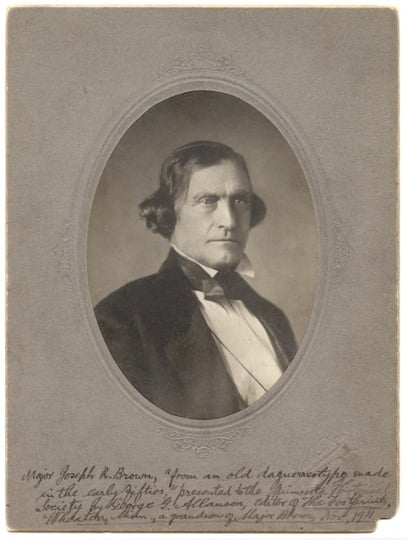
- Joseph Brown, 1863

Member of the Minnesota Territorial House of Representatives
- In office 1857–1857

Member of the Minnesota Territorial Council
- In office 1854–1855

Member of the Wisconsin Territorial Legislature
- In office 1840–1842

Personal details
- Born: Joseph Renshaw Brown; January 5, 1805 Harford County, Maryland
- Died: November 9, 1870 (aged 65) New York City, New York
- Spouse(s): Susan Frenier (3rd wife); Margaret (unknown) (1st wife - divorced December 1839).
- Occupation: politician, pioneer, fur trader, newspaper editor, businessman, inventor, speculator, Indian agent

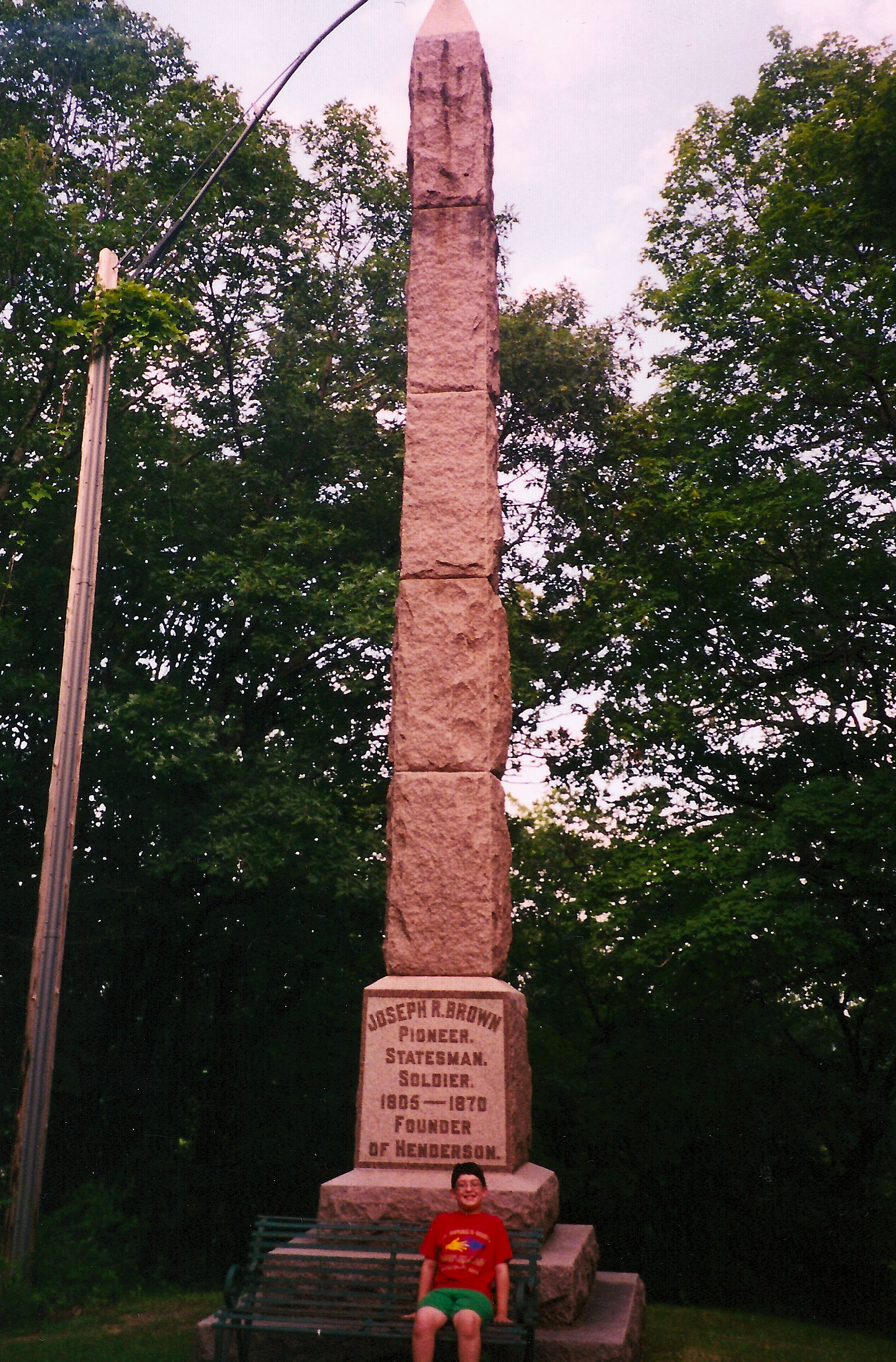
Joseph Brown's Monument in Brown Cemetery

Joseph Renshaw Brown (1805–1870) was an American politician, pioneer, fur trader, newspaper editor, businessman, inventor, speculator, and Indian agent who was prominent in Minnesota and Wisconsin territorial and state politics for over 50 years.

== Early life and family ==
Brown was born in Harford County, Maryland, on January 5, 1805. His third wife, Susan Frenier (1819-1904), was a member of the Sisseton tribe of Dakota and the half-sister of Gabriel Renville, who became his legal ward.

At the age of 15, he left his apprenticeship as a printer to join the army, and was sent to Cantonment New Hope to work on the construction of Fort Snelling. He was discharged from the army in 1828.

== Public service ==
Brown first came to Minnesota in 1820 when the land was Michigan Territory, traveling throughout what became Minnesota and Wisconsin during this time. In 1857, he was appointed Indian Agent to the Dakota Sioux.

Brown served in the House of Representatives of the Wisconsin Territorial Legislature from 1840-1842. He also served in the Territorial Council of the Minnesota Territorial Legislature from 1854-1855, representing District 6, and in the Minnesota Territorial House of Representatives in 1857, representing District 10. He also represented District 10 at the Minnesota Constitutional Convention in 1857.

== Role in Dakota War of 1862 ==
When the Dakota War of 1862 broke out, his "mixed-blood" family and the white settlers fleeing with them were captured but not killed due to his wife's bravery in standing up to Dakota leaders Stands on Clouds, also known as "Cut Nose," Little Six, Dowanniye and combatant Dakota who surrounded their wagon and threatened them. Their son Samuel J. Brown later wrote, "So she stood up in the wagon, and waving her shawl she cried in a loud voice that she was a Sisseton –– a relative of Waanatan, Scarlet Plume, Sweetcorn, Akipa and friend of Standing Buffalo, that she had come down this way for protection and hoped to get it." One of the men in their party recognized Susan Brown and argued in favor of sparing her life, because she had taken him in one winter and saved his life. When the men said they would kill the whites in their party regardless, she declared, "Remember what I say, if you harm any of these friends of mine, you will have to answer to Scarlet Plume, Akipa, Standing Buffalo, and the whole Sisseton and Wahpeton tribe!"

Susan Brown and her children were rescued on August 23 by her stepfather Akipa, a Wahpeton, and her half-brother Charles Renville Crawford, who demanded their release. She spent the rest of the war under the protection of the noncombatant Dakota camp of Akipa, Gabriel Renville and the Dakota Peace Party, which opposed conflict with the United States. In the final days of the war, Little Crow confided in Susan Brown as he grew increasingly despondent about his options.

Joseph Brown was away at the outbreak of the war. Upon his return, desperate to find out what happened to his wife and family, he asked to join the burial expedition which left Fort Ridgely on August 31, 1862, and ended up wounded by a ball in his neck on September 2 during the Battle of Birch Coulee. He was finally reunited with his family at Camp Release.

He died on November 9, 1870, in New York City and was buried in Brown Cemetery, Henderson, Minnesota.

== House and legacy ==
Joseph R. Brown, 1865

The Joseph R. Brown State Wayside Rest is located on Renville County Highway 15, south of Sacred Heart, Minnesota. The site displays the granite ruins of Brown's home, which was destroyed on August 19, 1862, during the Dakota War of 1862. The three-story home was a considered a mansion when compared with many other pioneer homes of the day.

Minnesota's Brown County, Browns Valley in Traverse County, and Brown's Creek near Stillwater in Washington County are named after him.

== Personal life ==
Brown was married three times. His first wife, Margaret, was considered a "Mixed-blood Ojibwe", whom he divorced in December 1839.
