= William Crooks =

William Crooks may refer to:

- William Crooks (Canadian politician) (1776–1836), businessman and political figure in Upper Canada
- William Crooks (locomotive), the first steam locomotive to operate in Minnesota
- Will Crooks (1852–1921), Labour member of the British House of Commons
- William Crooks (colonel) (1832–1907), American Civil War veteran for the Union

== See also ==
- William Crookes, English chemist and physicist
- William Crook (disambiguation)
