= 6th Minnesota Infantry Regiment =

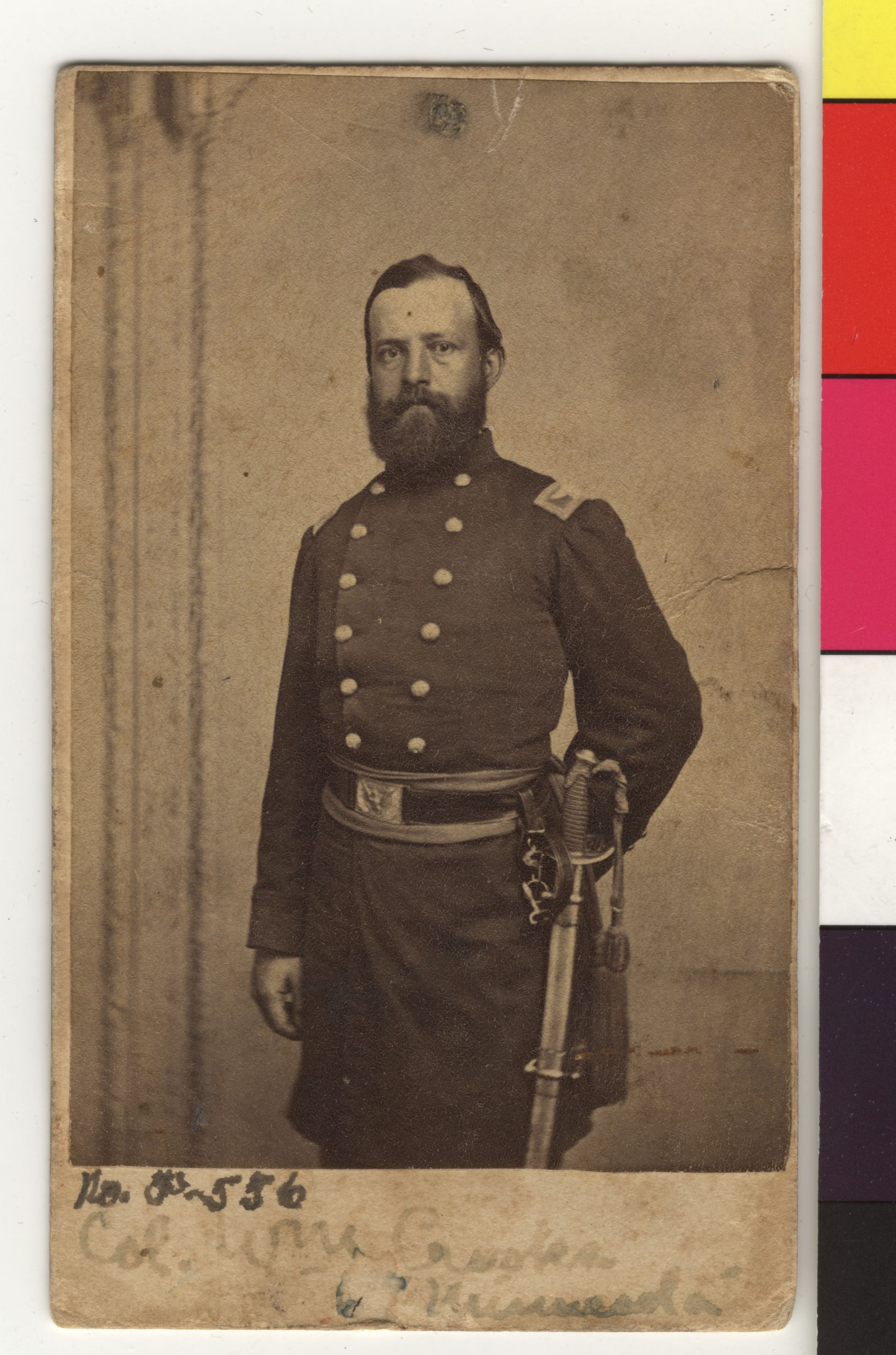
- Portrait of Colonel William Crooks in St. Paul, Minnesota
- Active: September 29, 1862, to August 19, 1865
- Country: United States
- Allegiance: Union
- Branch: Infantry
- Engagements: American Civil War; Siege of Spanish Fort; Battle of Fort Blakeley; U.S.-Dakota War of 1862; Battle of Birch Coulee; Battle of Wood Lake; Sibley's 1863 Campaign; Battle of Big Mound; Battle of Dead Buffalo Lake; Battle of Stony Lake

Commanders
- Notable commanders: William Crooks; John T. Averill

The 6th Minnesota Infantry Regiment was an infantry regiment that fought in the Union Army during the American Civil War. The 6th Minnesota Infantry spent much of the war in the Northwest fighting Dakota Indians rather than participating in the battles with the Confederacy. Led by William Crooks, the regiment saw action in the American Civil War mainly with the Dakota Tribe.

== Service ==
The 6th Minnesota Infantry Regiment was mustered into Federal service at Camp Release and Fort Snelling during 1862.

- A, B, F, G Companies 1 October, Fort Snelling garrison duty.
- C Co. 13 October
- D Co. 29 September
- E Co. 5 October
- I Co. 4 October
- K Co. 10 October Fort Snelling garrison duty.
- H Co. 20 November

Original Organization of Regiment.
Company	Primary Place of Recruitment	Earliest Captain
A	Ramsey County and Dakota County	Hiram Perry Grant
B	Hennepin County	Orlando C. Merriman
C	Rice County and Hennepin County	Hiram S. Bailey
D	Hennepin County	Joseph C. Whitney
E	Prussia, Germany and Switzerland	Rudolph Schoenemann
F	Goodhue County	Horace B. Wilson
G	Ramsey County and Carver County	Daniel H. Valentine
H	Olmsted County, Minnesota	William K. Tattersall
I	Washington County, Blue Earth County, and Nicollet County	Carlisle A. Bromley
K	Houston County and Fillmore County	William Harrison Woodward

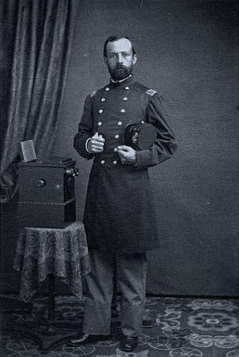
Colonel William Crooks

The regiment was part of the second wave of enlistments following the early battles of the Civil War. The regiment was not immediately sent South because the Army hoped for a quick victory. The regiment participated in the Dakota War of 1862, that erupted in August 1862. Company A fought in the Battle of Birch Coulee, the worst defeat suffered by U.S. forces during the war. Survivors of Birch Coulee defeated Dakota warriors in the decisive Battle of Wood Lake a few weeks later. At the end of September, they also witnessed the surrender of the Dakota at Camp Release.

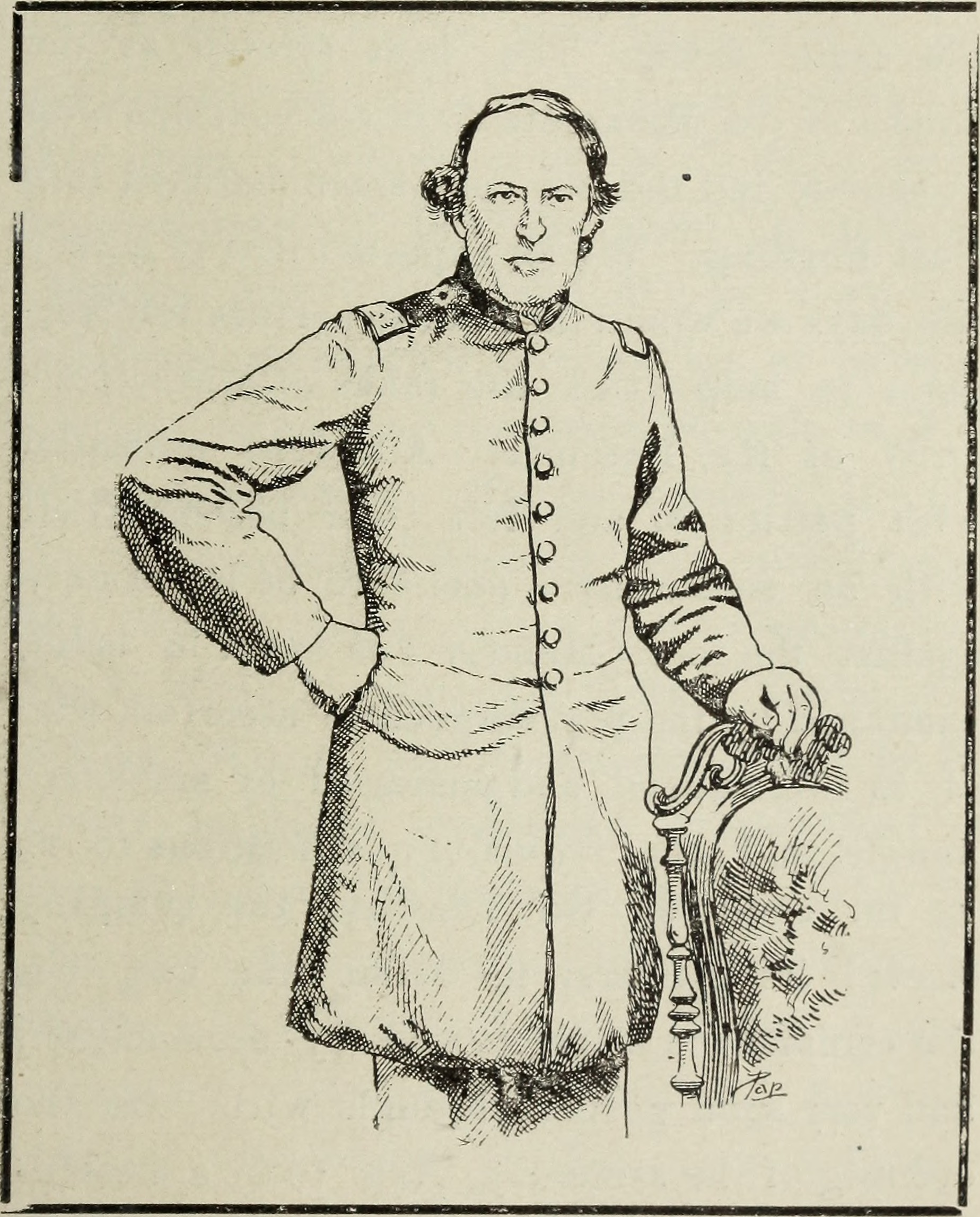
Captain Horace B. Wilson of Company K. Wilson was present at the Battle of Wood Lake where he was wounded.

After the hostilities ended, the 6th regiment remained on the frontier and prepared for possible further fighting with the Sioux, who had been forced to leave Minnesota as a result of the hostilities. During the summer of 1863, under the command of Henry Sibley, the 6th regiment pursued and fought bands of Sioux in the Dakota Territory. They pushed them west across the Missouri River and north into Canada. They then returned to Fort Snelling. They continued garrison duty in Minnesota and to the West throughout the winter and spring of 1863–1864.

By the spring of that year, the men of the 6th regiment successfully argued that they should be sent to the South. They found garrison duty boring and wanted to fight in the war for which they enlisted. Finally, that summer, on June 14, 1864, they left Fort Snelling to go South.

The 950 men of the 6th regiment arrived in Helena, Arkansas, on June 23, 1864, spending the next four months in what Private Charles W. Johnson of Company D described as "a series of swamps, bayous and flat lands, overflowed from the Mississippi in high water, reeking with miasma and covered with green scum in dry weather." On September 30, 1864, 654 members of the 6th regiment were reported as sick; by then, 461 men had been sent to hospitals in the North. By the end of October 1864, two officers and fifty-eight enlisted men had died from disease; the primary cause was malaria. The regiment lost more men to disease than it did in battle.

In Arkansas, the regiment observed guerrilla forces in the region but participated in no battles. After a few months, the men were sent to St. Louis and New Orleans in late January 1865.

The 6th Minnesota finally fought the Confederates in the spring of 1865. In Alabama, the 6th Regiment took part in General Edward Canby's campaign to capture Mobile, Alabama, in March and April 1865. The 6th was in reserve during the capture of Fort Blakeley on April 9, and then guarded Montgomery.

The regiment was mustered in Fort Snelling, Minnesota on August 19, 1865.

== Casualties ==
The 6th Regiment Minnesota Volunteer Infantry suffered 12 enlisted men killed in action or who later died of their wounds, plus another 4 officers and 161 enlisted men who died of disease, for a total of 177 fatalities.

== Colonels ==
- Colonel William Crooks – August 23, 1862, to October 28, 1864.
- Colonel John T. Averill – November 22, 1864, to September 30, 1865.

== See also ==
- List of Minnesota Civil War Units
