= Horace B. Wilson =

American politician

Horace Brown Wilson
- Wilson c. 1860's

Member of the Minnesota Senate from the 16th District
- In office January 6, 1879 – January 1, 1883

Member of the Minnesota House of Representatives from the 16th District
- In office January 2, 1877 – January 7, 1878

Personal details
- Born: March 30, 1821 Bingham, Maine, U.S.
- Died: January 31, 1908 (age 86) Red Wing, Minnesota, U.S.
- Party: Republican
- Education: Maine Wesleyan Seminary (1841); Indiana Asbury College (1858)
- Profession: Civil Engineer and mathematician

Military service
- Allegiance: United States of America
- Branch/service: Union Army
- Years of service: 1862–1865
- Rank: Captain
- Unit: 6th Minnesota Infantry Regiment
- Commands: Company F, 6th Minnesota Infantry Regiment
- Battles/wars: Dakota War of 1862; Battle of Wood Lake (WIA); Sibley's 1863 Campaign; Battle of Big Mound; Battle of Dead Buffalo Lake; Battle of Stony Lake

Horace Brown Wilson (March 30, 1821 – January 31, 1908), sometimes referred to as H.B. Wilson, was an America politician, educator, and soldier. Wilson served three nonconsecutive terms in the Minnesota Legislature. Wilson later served on the Board of Regents for the University of Minnesota.

== Early life and education ==
Horace Brown Wilson was born in Bingham, Maine on March 30, 1821.^{:387}^{:1059} Wilson was educated in Maine and eventually studied at Maine Wesleyan Seminary in Kents Hill, Maine and graduated in the summer of 1841.

== Career ==
Wilson eventually moved west to Cincinnati and taught school, later moving to Lawrenceburg, Indiana, where he took charge of the Dearborn County, Indiana seminary.^{:1059} While living in New Albany, Indiana, in 1844 Wilson served as the Superintendent of Schools from 1844 to 1850 and served in the Municipal Government of New Albany as the city civil engineer from 1850 to 1856.^{:1059} Wilson later studied at Indiana Asbury College (later DePauw University) and graduated with an Honorary Master of Arts degree in civil engineering in July 1858. Following his term at Asbury, Wilson briefly studied law and was admitted to the Indiana bar examination, although he never practiced law.^{:1059} In 1858, the same year that Minnesota was admitted into the Union, Wilson moved to Minneapolis–Saint Paul and taught mathematics and civil engineering as a professor for Hamline University which at the time was located in Red Wing.^{:1059} According to the Minnesota Historical Society, the inclusion of Wilson as a professor of both math and civil engineering allowed Hamline University to offer a complete college curriculum. Besides pedagogy, Wilson served as an alderman and member of the municipal city council in Red Wing, Minnesota.^{:1059}

== Military service ==
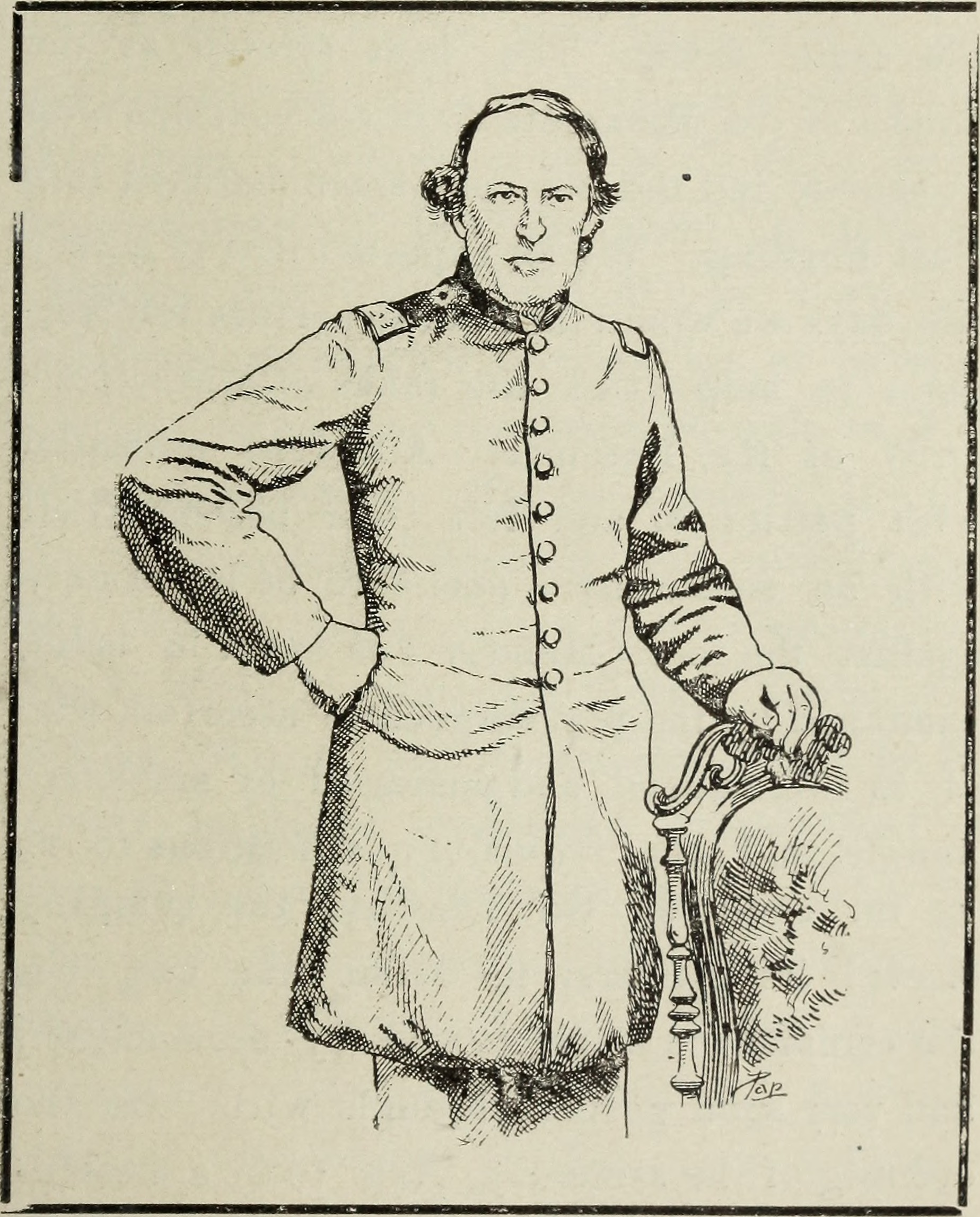
Wilson c. 1862

At the outbreak of the American Civil War at the age of 41 Wilson enlisted into the Union Army on August 22, 1862, and was enrolled into the officer ranks of the 6th Minnesota Infantry Regiment as the Captain of Company F. The majority of Company F came from Goodhue County, Minnesota and even included some of Wilson's students from Hamline University.^{:17} Company F was raised in August 1862 and mustered into service at Camp Release, Company F was subsequently posted on outpost duty at Forest City, Minnesota.

The 6th Minnesota's first battle was at the Battle of Birch Coulee which ended in disaster. Wilson's Company F acted as the relief force commanded by Henry Hastings Sibley and Samuel McPhail to rescue Captain Hiram Perry Grant of Company A, Major Joseph R. Brown, and Captain Joseph Anderson of the Cullen Frontier Guard who were all ambushed by Big Eagle while acting as a burial detail to recover and bury the bodies of the victims of the attack at the Lower Sioux Agency.^{:12} Company F's first formal engagement was the Battle of Wood Lake, during the battle Wilson was shot through his shoulder and gravely wounded.^{:18} According to Franklyn Curtiss-Wedge's book The History of Goodhue County Wilson never fully recovered from the wound in his shoulder.^{:1060} The book Minnesota in the Civil and Indian Wars 1861–1865 states the following about Wilson and Company F during the course of the battle:

"The engagement continued about two hours, after which the Indians retreated in great haste, and were seen no more that day. The men were ordered back to camp. Those of Companies A and F were nearly a mile from the rest of the regiment, overlooking a ravine in which many Indians were concealed, lying down flat on their faces in the tall, rank marsh grass. It was here that Capt. Wilson was wounded in the shoulder. His company was very busily engaged".^{:311}

Wilson and members of Company F were the guard detail which escorted the Dakota prisoners during the 1862 Mankato mass execution.^{:1059} The 6th Minnesota later took part in Sibley's 1863 Campaign and fought at the Battle of Big Mound, the Battle of Dead Buffalo Lake, and the Battle of Stony Lake. Following the end of Sibley's Campaign the 6th Minnesota was re-routed to the Western Theatre of the American Civil War where it continued to fight against the Confederates at the Siege of Spanish Fort and the Battle of Fort Blakeley. Wilson was discharged with the rest of the regiment on August 19, 1865.

== Political career ==
From 1877 to 1882, Wilson served as a Republican legislator for the Minnesota Legislature representing District 16 of Red Wing and Goodhue County, Minnesota. Wilson served a total of three terms in the 19th Minnesota Legislature, the 21st Minnesota Legislature, and the 22nd Minnesota Legislature before leaving the field of politics in 1892. Wilson first served in the Minnesota House in 1877 as part of District 16, and later in the Minnesota Senate from 1879 to 1882 as part of District 16.

== Later life and death ==
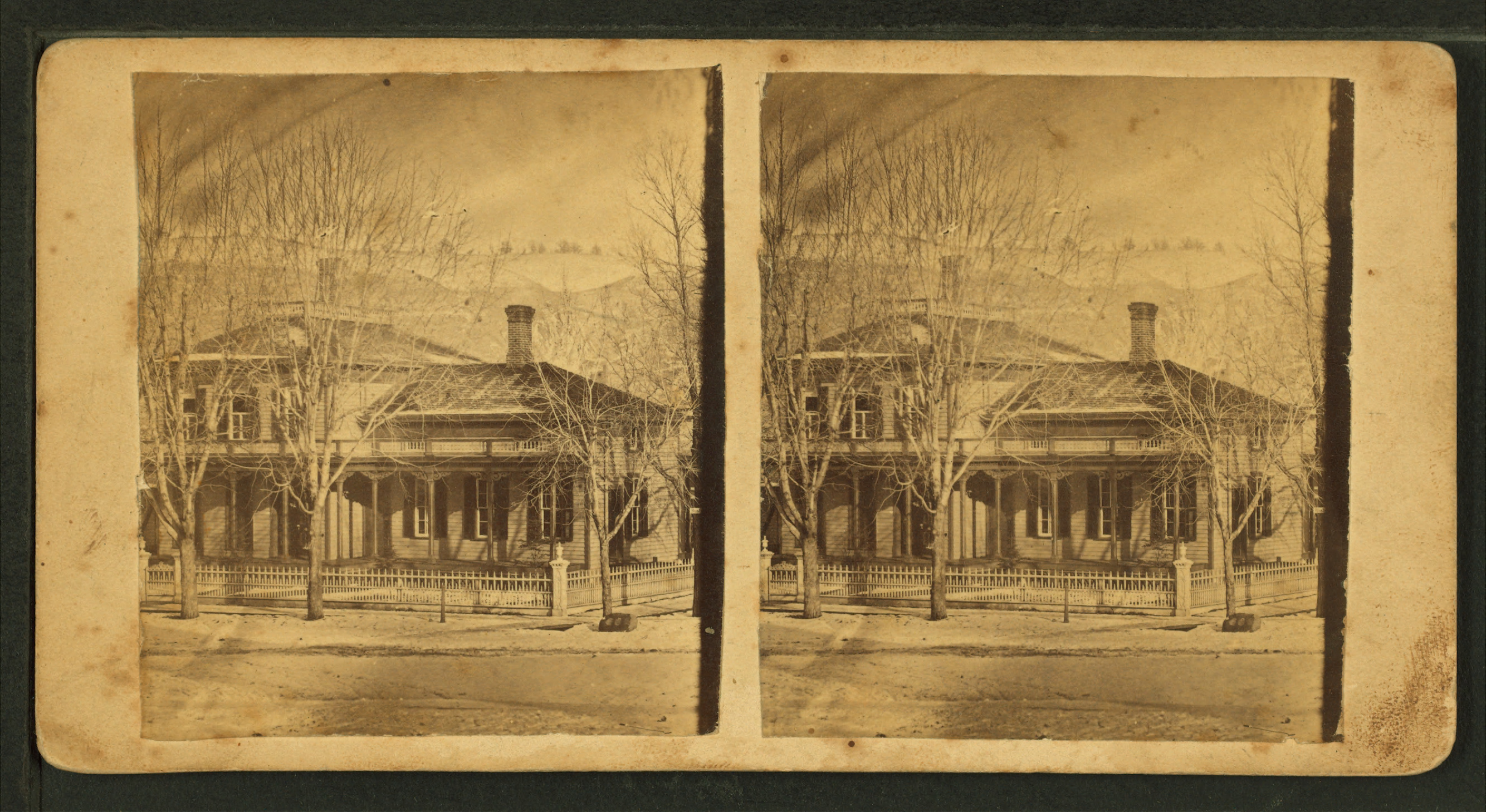
Residence of H. B. Wilson, from Robert N. Dennis collection of stereoscopic views

Following his service in the military Wilson was elected to the position of Superintendent of Schools for the school board and administration of Goodhue County, serving from 1866 to 1870. Wilson was later appointed as the Minnesota State Superintendent of Public Instruction, serving from 1870 to 1877. During this time Wilson also served on the Board of Regents for the University of Minnesota from August 1, 1870, to April, 1875.

In the postwar era Wilson was a member of the Freemasons and for several years was Masonic High Priest of La Grange Royal Arch Chapter. Wilson was also a member of A.E. Welch Post #075 of the Grand Army of the Republic (GAR) located in Red Wing. The post was named in honor of Major Abraham Edward Welch (1839–1864) of the 4th Minnesota Infantry Regiment who died of disease at Nashville, Tennessee, on February 1, 1864. Wilson died on January 31, 1908, in Red Wing.

== Personal life ==
Wilson had a total of two wives, he was first married to Mary Jane Chandler of Lawrenceburg, Indiana, in 1844 and later to Flora Jessie Sargent of Denver in 1892 after he left political office. Wilson had a total of four children; Frank M. Wilson and Oliver Wilson (sons); Alice Wilson and Mattie Wilson (daughters). Frank M. Wilson, a United States Military Academy graduate and fellow Hamline University alumni eventually became a lawyer and Republican member of the Minnesota House of Representatives from 1893 to 1894.
