= William Crooks (locomotive) =

Locomotive of the Saint Paul and Pacific Railroad

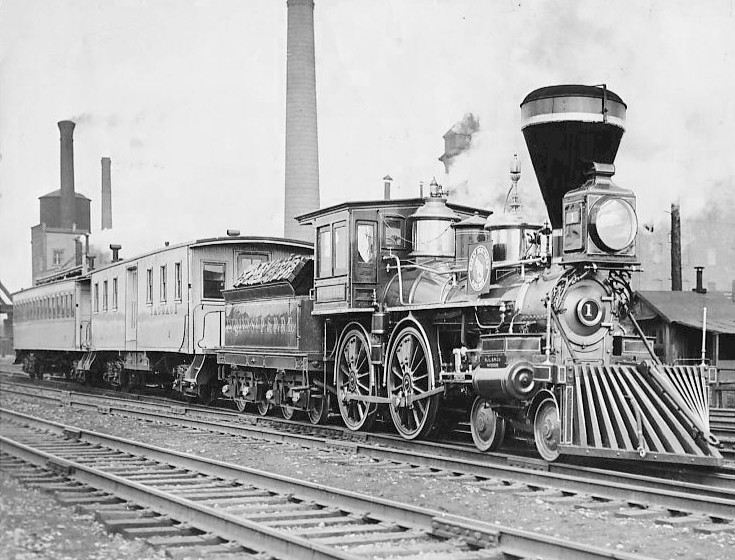
- En route to the New York World’s Fair in 1939
Type and origin
- Power type: Steam
- Builder: New Jersey Locomotive and Machine Co.
- Build date: 1861
- Rebuild date: 1869; 1924
Specifications
- Configuration
  - Whyte: 4-4-0
- Gauge: 1,435 mm (4 ft 8 1/2 in)
- Leading dia.: 28 in (711 mm)
- Driver dia.: 63 in (1.600 m)
- Length: 50 ft 8 1/4 in (15.450 m)
- Loco weight: 55,400 lb (25,100 kg)
- Tender weight: 17,975 lb (8,153 kg)
- Fuel type: Wood
- Boiler pressure: 110 psi (0.76 MPa)
- Cylinders: Two, outside
- Cylinder size: 12 in × 22 in (300 mm × 560 mm)
- Valve gear: Stephenson
- Valve type: Side valve
- Loco brake: Steam
- Train brakes: Steam
- Couplers: Link-and-pin
Performance figures
- Factor of adh.: 7.65
Career
- Operators: St. Paul and Pacific Railroad, Great Northern Railway
- Class: 1
- Numbers: 1
- First run: June 1862
- Retired: September 1897 (revenue service); 1954 (excursion service)
- Restored: 1908
- Current owner: Minnesota Historical Society, loaned to Lake Superior Railroad Museum
- Disposition: On static display

The William Crooks is a 4-4-0 steam locomotive, which became the first to operate in the State of Minnesota, beginning in 1862. It was named after William Crooks, the Chief Mechanical Engineer for the St. Paul and Pacific Railroad. Crooks laid the initial 10-mile (16 km) track between Minneapolis and St. Paul, and the William Crooks was the first locomotive to run on the line.

== History ==
=== 1861–1900 ===
Constructed in 1861 in Paterson, New Jersey, for the Minnesota and Pacific Railroad as their number 1, The William Crooks first provided service a year later, in 1862, for the St. Paul and Pacific Railroad (into which the M&P had been reorganized). After completion, the locomotive traveled by rail to La Crosse, Wisconsin, then the nearest rail point to St. Paul. From there, it was loaded onto a Mississippi River barge bound for St. Paul. Though it arrived in St. Paul on September 9, 1861, it was not until June 28, 1862, that the passenger equipment arrived and 10 miles (16 km) of track could be laid. The William Crooks carried a ceremonial delegation the governor of Minnesota, the founder of the railroad, and other dignitaries on the same day, leaving at 2:30 PM from St. Paul and returning from their 10-mile (16 km) trip to St. Anthony (now Minneapolis) at 6 PM. It entered regular service four days later.

The locomotive was originally a wood-burner with a tender that held just two cords of wood. Often the tender's wood was used before the train could reach a wood pile, forcing the crew to make use of the wooden right-of-way fences to keep the train moving. Later the locomotive was converted into a coal-burner. As built, the engine had a straight boiler (not tapered from a larger diameter at the firebox end to a smaller diameter at the smokebox end), had the balloon stack typical of wood burning engines, and three domes, the frontmost dome containing the whistle, the center dome for sanding the rails to improve traction when needed, and the rear dome containing the safety valves. As the engine aged and parts were replaced, the engine's appearance changed. It received a diamond stack for burning coal, its boiler was replaced with a tapered design, the front dome removed, and the whistle moved to the rear dome.

In 1868, a fire partially destroyed the William Crooks. Albion B. Smith was tasked with restoring the locomotive and became the locomotive's engineer once it returned to service. He became a personal friend to James J. Hill, savior of the Saint Paul and Pacific, and chief executive of the Great Northern Railway which had absorbed the smaller line, through his works and service with the William Crooks.

The old locomotive had served over 35 years and had eventually been assigned to runs in Montana and Washington. The William Crooks was in passenger service until September 30, 1897, after which it was retired, and by the turn of the century was sitting decommissioned in a corner of the Great Northern yard in St. Paul. The locomotive was restored to operation for Hill's 70th birthday in 1908, as he had insisted when informed of its condition. Smith, who worked a regular schedule for the Great Northern Railway, would be reassigned to duty with the William Crooks for special events such as this and, later, the Alaska–Yukon–Pacific Exposition. After he received word that the William Crooks was to be scrapped, it was Smith who spoke to Hill about it, with Hill declaring, "Not as long as I live". After Hill's death in 1916, the Great Northern continued to exhibit the train at special events. The railroad gave the engine a balloon stack similar in appearance to its original, but internally designed to be suitable for coal as well as wood.

=== 1900–present ===
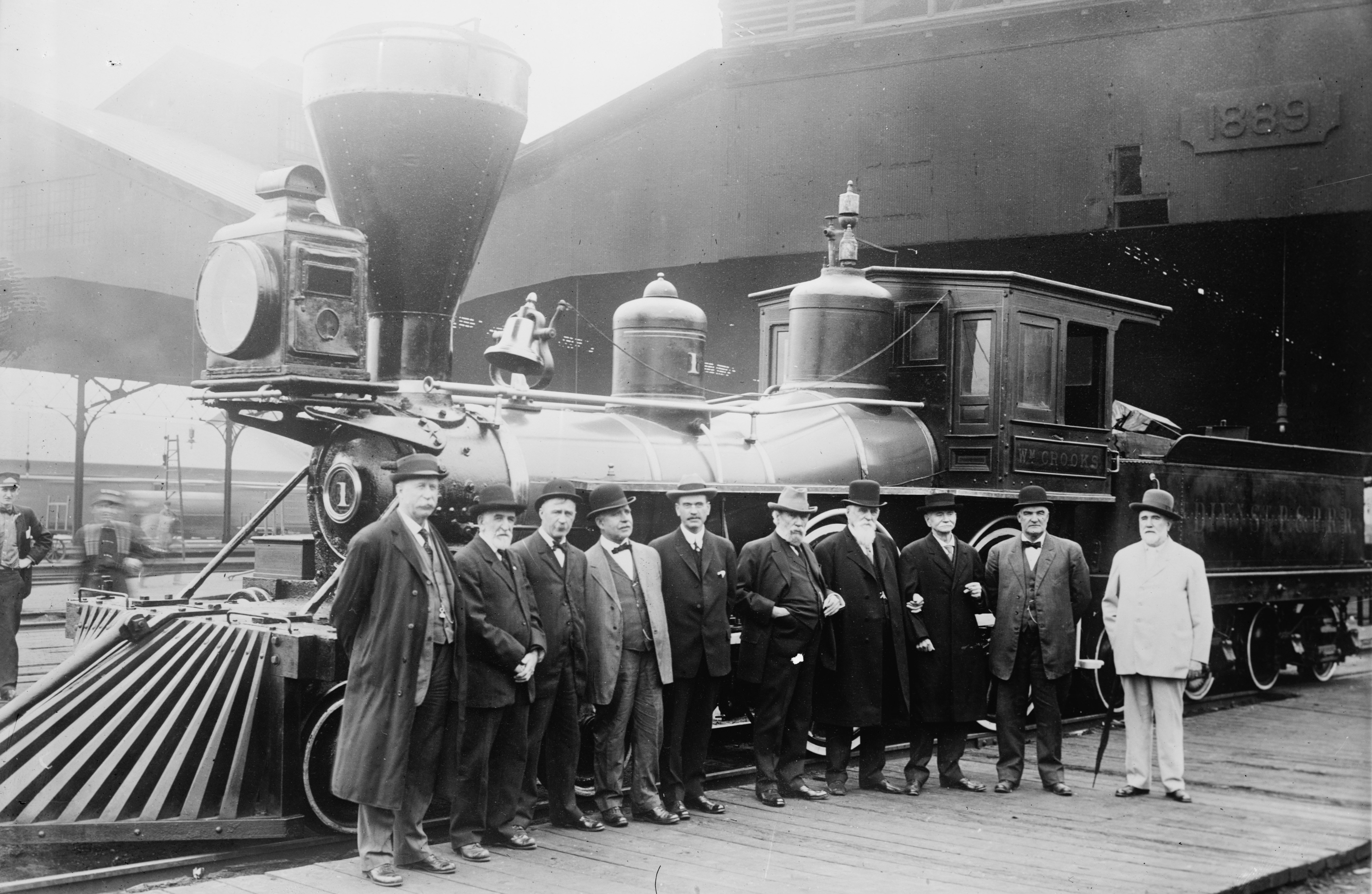
James J. Hill (sixth man from the left) with William Crooks in the 1910s

In 1924, the locomotive went on an exhibition tour from Chicago to Seattle. For this event, the railroad rebuilt the engine to further resemble its original form, restoring it to the original three-dome configuration, though it retained the tapered boiler. The William Crooks was displayed at the Baltimore and Ohio Railroad's "Fair of the Iron Horse" in 1927, then at the 1939 New York World's Fair, and finally at the Chicago Railroad Fair in 1948 as part of the "Wheels A-Rolling" pageant, traveling to and from all three events under its own power. Though the locomotive had been converted from burning wood to burning coal as fuel, its headlight remained lit by kerosene; this restricted the William Crooks' travel to daylight hours only.

On the way to the 1939 World's Fair, the locomotive made a stop in Paterson, New Jersey, where it had been built 78 years before. The old locomotive made many stops en route to New York City, drawing crowds everywhere it went. At that time it was the oldest locomotive operating under its own power. Accompanying the William Crooks was John J. Maher, a retired Great Northern engineer. Maher began his career with the railroad in 1881 as a fireman for the William Crooks; he became the locomotive's engineer in 1888. He indicated that there had been no breakdowns during the trip from St. Paul and speculated that the locomotive could probably travel at up to 60 miles per hour (100 km/h) without difficulty.

Maher, whose work as a fireman took place before the William Crooks was converted to burning coal, recalled that in the early days, part of a fireman's equipment was an axe, so wood could be chopped if the wood in the locomotive's tender ran out. He said he often needed to go out and look for wood to keep the William Crooks moving. The locomotive was accompanied to the World's Fair by two 1880s vintage coaches which still had their original candle holders from the days when they were lit by candle light, and their original wood stoves for warmth.

Its cylinders, rods and bearings were all rebuilt at the Great Northern's Dale Street Shops in St. Paul in 1947-48.

The William Crooks was placed on display at the St. Paul Union Depot in June 1954. In June 1962 the Great Northern transferred ownership of the engine to the Minnesota Historical Society, though the engine remained displayed in the depot. The St. Paul Union Depot closed to passenger traffic in 1971; however, the engine was not removed until 1975, when it was moved to the newly established Lake Superior Railroad Museum in Duluth, Minnesota, where it remains.

== Legacy ==
The William Crooks is one of only a few locomotives from the time of the Civil War that survive today. For the celebration of the 150th anniversary of rail service in Minnesota, the locomotive's whistle was blown for the first time since 1948, when it appeared at the Chicago Railroad Fair.

In 1959-1960 Marx Toy Company retailed, through Montgomery Ward, an electric toy train using the William Crooks locomotive design and freight express cars for their Tales of Wells Fargo play-set. In 1973 the train was reissued, as a Heritage play-set, The Pioneer Express, retailed through Sears & Roebuck, with the locomotive pulling the tender, an open lumber car and caboose.

== Gallery ==
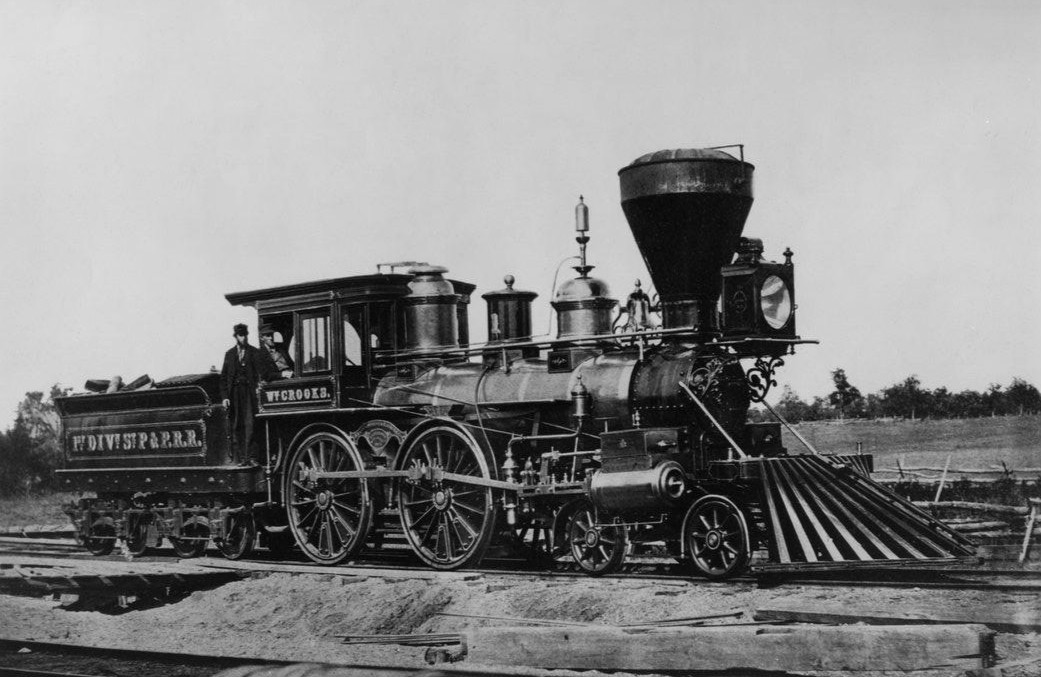
William Crooks near Elk River, Minnesota in 1864

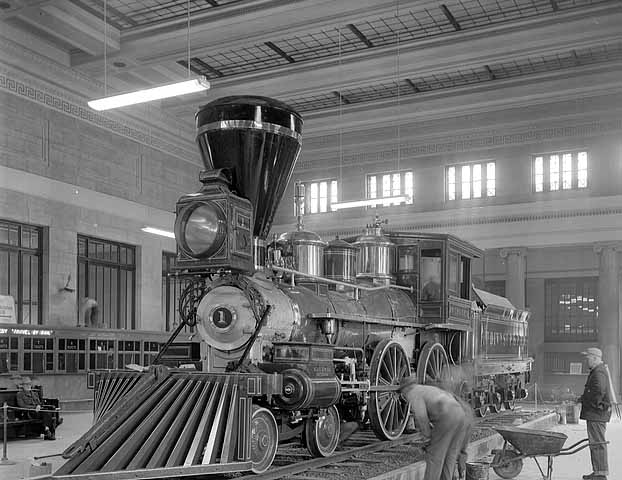
William Crooks being placed on display at the Saint Paul Union Depot

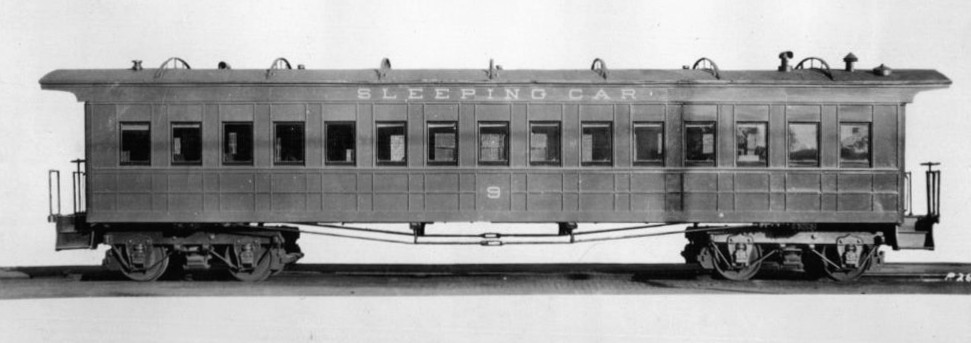
This Pullman sleeping car, original to the train, was part of the 1924 exhibition tour.

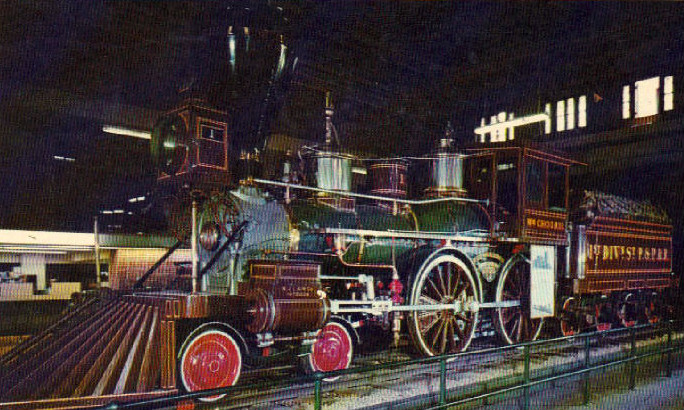
The William Crooks on display in the Saint Paul Union Depot in 1962

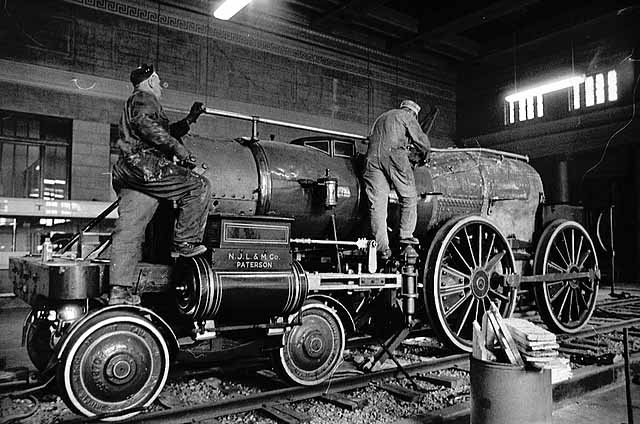
William Crooks being dismantled in preparation for its move to the Lake Superior Railroad Museum in 1975

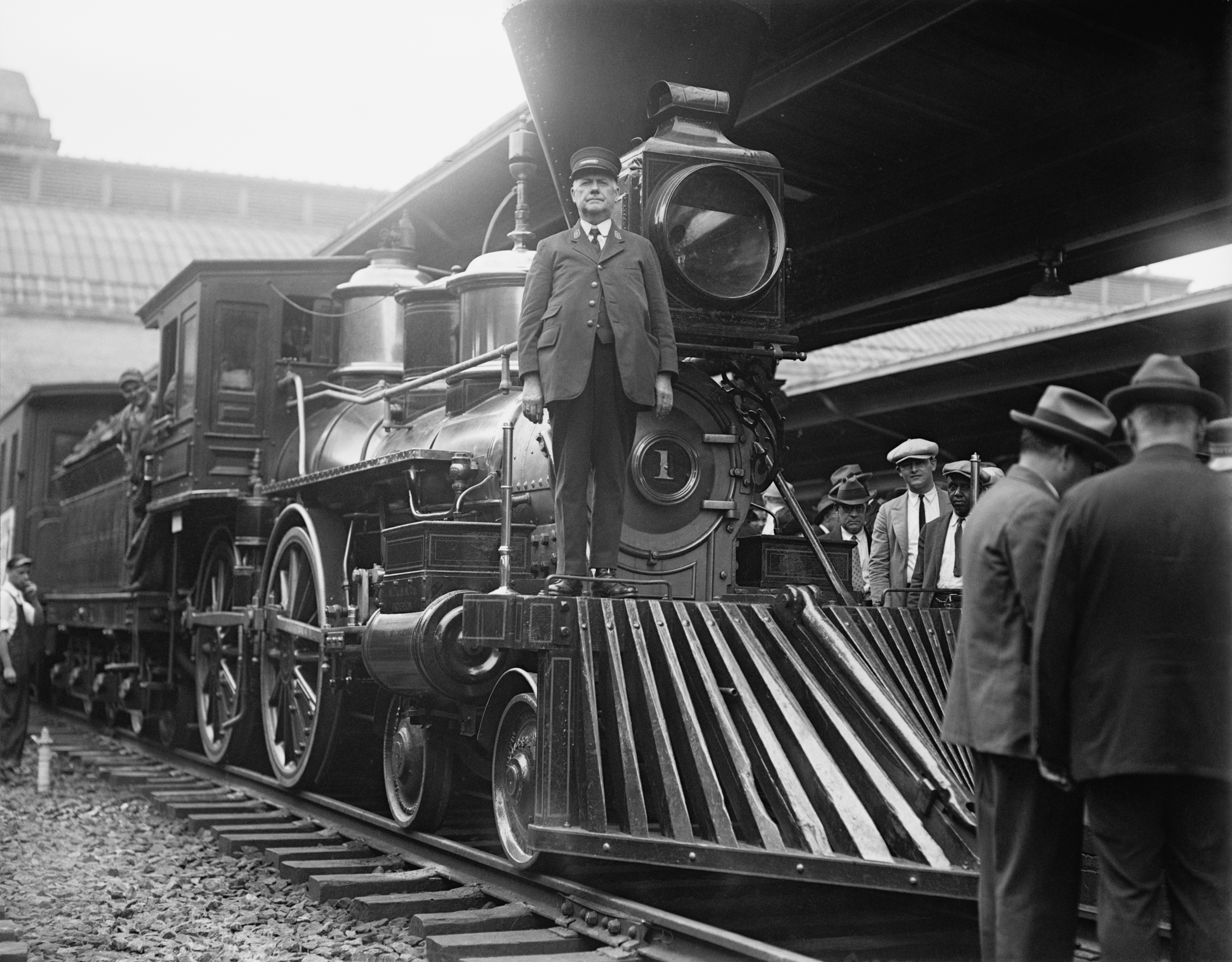
Publicity photo of the William Crooks at Union Station, Washington, D.C., on 20 September 1927 while en route to the Fair of the Iron Horse

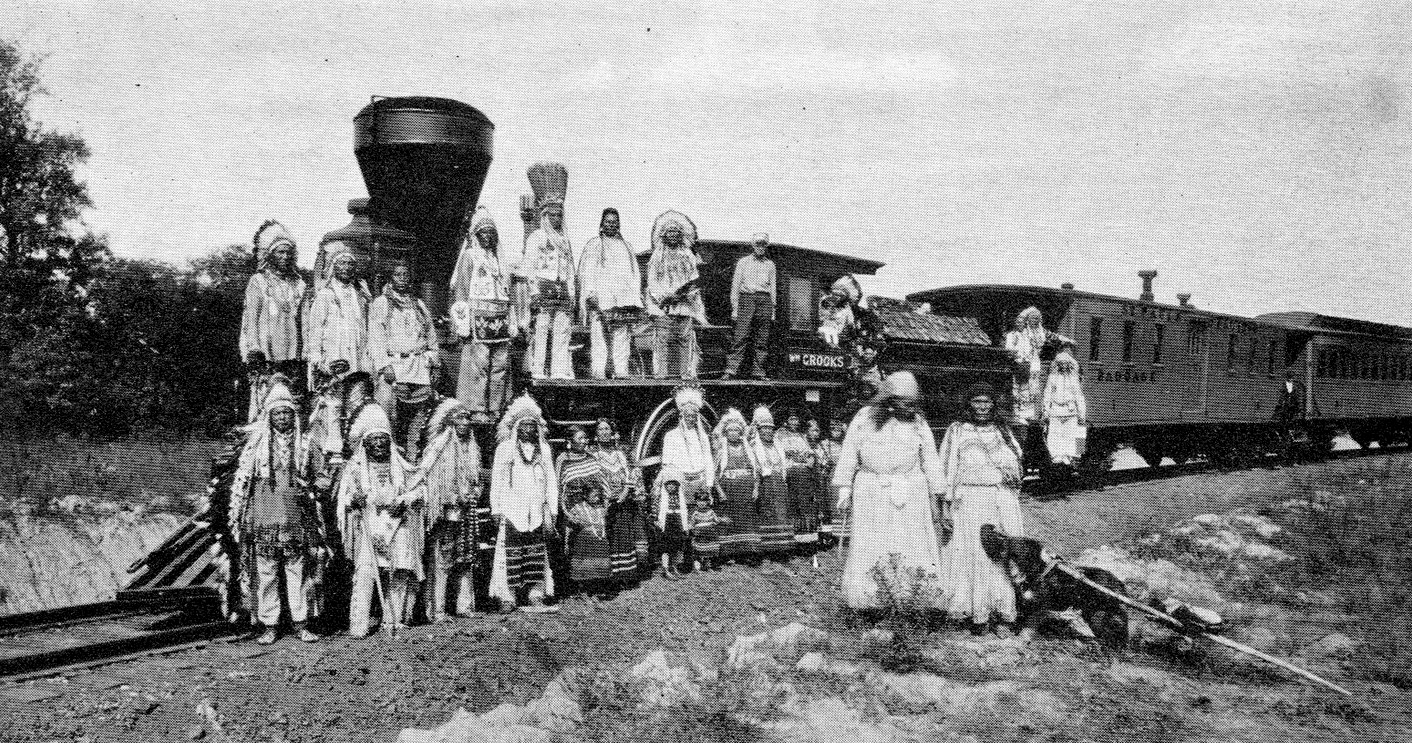
Postcard photo of the William Crooks with members of the Blackfoot tribe. The photo was taken at the Fair of the Iron Horse in Baltimore, MD, in 1927.

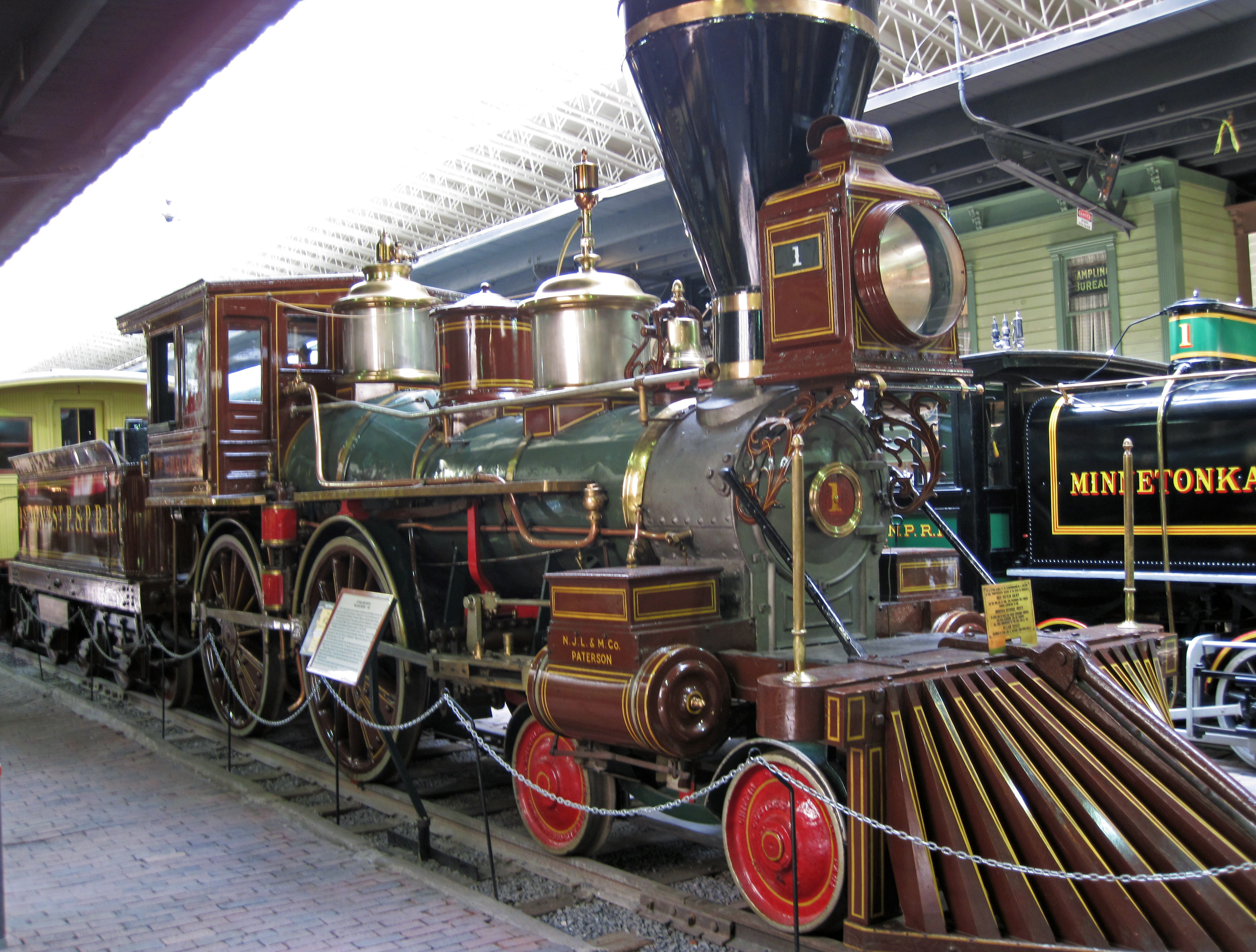
The William Crooks In 2015

== Works cited ==
- Wills Boosters, Hustlers and Speculators St. Paul MN Hist. Soc. 2005
- Chicago Railroad Fair Official Guide Book (1949).
- Middleton, Kenneth R.; Keyes, Norman C. Jr. (Autumn 1980). "The Great Northern Railway Company: Predecessors and Fully-Controlled Subsidiaries". Railroad History (143). Boston, Massachusetts: The Railway and Locomotive Historical Society, Inc.: 8–19. ISSN 0090-7847.
- Keyes, Norman C. Jr.; Middleton, Kenneth R. (Autumn 1980). "The Great Northern Railway Company: All-Time Locomotive Roster, 1861–1970". Railroad History (143). Boston, Massachusetts: The Railway and Locomotive Historical Society, Inc.: 20–162. ISSN 0090-7847.
