= Ramsay Crooks =

American fur trader

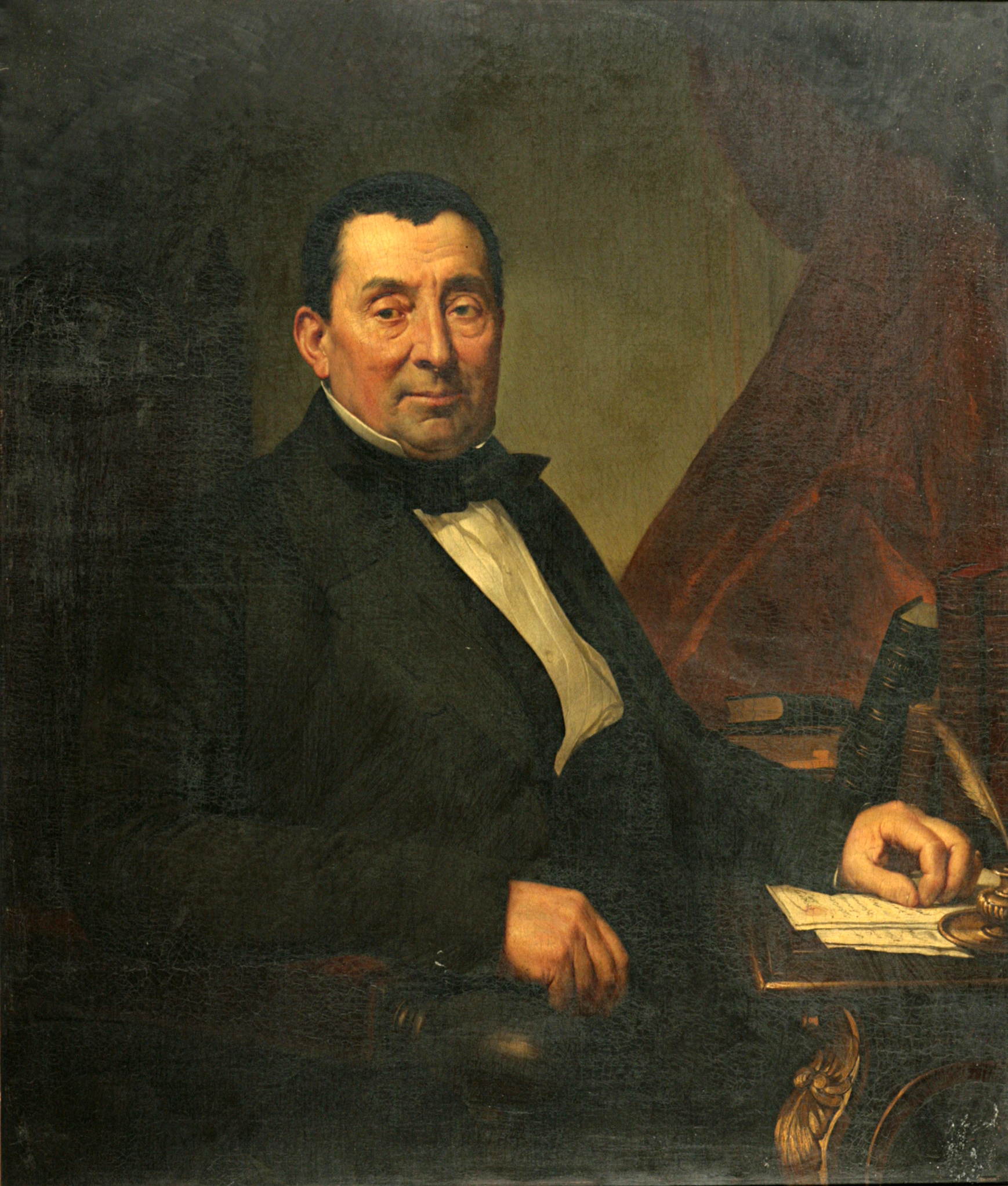

Personal details
- Born: January 2, 1787 Greenock, Scotland
- Died: June 6, 1859 (aged 72) Manhattan, New York
- Resting place: Green-Wood Cemetery, New York City
- Children: William Crooks and 8 others

Ramsay Crooks (2 January 1787 – 6 June 1859) was an American fur trader who was president of the American Fur Company after John Jacob Astor sold out of the company from 1834 to 1839.

Ramsay helped W. Price Hunt to organize and lead an overland trip to Astoria in the Oregon Country for John Jacob Astor in 1809 through 1813, as a partner in the Pacific Fur Company. He became general manager of the American Fur Company in 1817 and became president of the company in 1834.

He was the father of American Civil War Colonel William Crooks who served in the 6th Minnesota Regiment.

== Early life ==
Crooks was born to William Crooks and Margaret Ramsay in Greenock, Scotland. He was one of five sons and four daughters.

In 1803, following the death of his father, Crooks arrived in Montreal, Quebec, with his family at the age of 16. Two of his brothers had previously come to Canada. He stayed in Montreal while his mother and the rest of the family went on to Newark.

== Fur trade ==
After arriving in Canada, Crooks was briefly employed as a clerk with Maitland, Garden and Auldjo, a Montreal mercantile firm that supplied dry goods and hardware. He then worked as a clerk for fur trader Robert Dickson at Michilimackinac (or Mackinac Island) on Lake Huron. From 1805 to 1810, he spent time on the Missouri River. Crooks was with George Gillespie (employed by Dickson) in 1805. He wintered in 1805–6 and 1806–7 on the Missouri with Robert Dickson and Company.

By 1807, Crooks had enough funds, supplemented by the fur trading Choteau Family, to form a partnership with Robert McClellan with the aim of trading with the Indians on the Missouri River. They formed an expedition of 40 men and went as far as South Dakota on the Missouri, but were forced back to Council Bluffs, Iowa, by about 600 Sioux. They erected a trading post at Council Bluffs.

Crooks and McClellan believed the Sioux were spurred on by Manuel Lisa, a Spanish trader of the Missouri Fur Company, and McClellan swore if he ever met Lisa he would kill him. Later, with the Astor Expedition, he met Lisa on the Missouri, but, with difficulty, he was restrained from carrying out his threat.

=== Astor expedition ===
In 1809 Crooks and McClellan dissolved their partnership. Crooks went to Mackinac to work for the Northwest Company (fur traders) where William Price Hunt, the organizer of the Astor expedition, signed him as a partner in the Astor group to take part in the expedition. Crooks became a founding partner in the Pacific Fur Company.

Crooks struggles on the expedition began quickly. After meeting Manuel Lisa and leaving the Missouri in 1810, Crooks fell seriously ill and had to be carried. Once he recovered, he nearly drowned on the Big Horn River when his canoe upset in rapids. Then, he was separated from the main group for twenty-seven days and nearly starved, though the main group had little more food than he did.

After crossing the Rockies, Crooks and five others were left behind in rural Oregon due to being unable to travel farther. He finally reached Astoria in May 1812 with John Day, three months after the rest of the group. A few days later, he relinquished his interest in the Pacific Fur Company, and traveled back east overland, crossing the South Pass in Wyoming as one of the first white men to do so.

=== American Fur Company ===
In 1813, Astor offered Crooks interest in his company to secure furs belonging to the South West Fur Company, which had been formed in 1811 by the American Fur Company and the North West Company. Based in Michilimackinac, Crooks traveled extensively around the area and assumed responsibility for American Fur Company concerns in the area.

In 1817, Crooks became a principal agent for the American Fur Company after Astor purchased the North West Company's interest in the South West Fur Company. He directed a company policy of Western expansion. In 1827, he brokered a partnership between his company and Bernard Pratte and Company in St. Louis (which was headed by his father-in-law) which led to equal shares for both companies on the Mississippi River trade below Prairie du Chien and along the Missouri River. He also consolidated the Columbia Fur Company. Crooks preferred to absorb rivals or come to terms with them.

In 1830, Crooks took out American naturalization papers.

In 1834, John Jacob Astor retired from his position at the American Fur Company, which he had founded in 1808. Crooks and other stockholders took over the northern division of the company, retaining use of the company name. Crooks was appointed president. In 1835, Crooks moved the American Fur Company's headquarters to La Pointe on Madeline Island.

In favor of diversified enterprises, Crooks agreed to American Fur Company agent Robert Stuart's suggestion of commercial fishing on Lake Superior to supplement waning fur trade revenues. He fought for control of Ohio Valley furs and commissioned fishing camps at some of Lake Superior's best fishing grounds: near Grand Portage, Fond du Lac, and Isle Royale. Crooks ordered the construction of several schooners, such as the John Jacob Astor, to ship fish in barrels to ports like Detroit, Cleveland, and Toledo. The company saw increases in output from 1836 to 1839. However, the Panic of 1837 caused a recession which shrunk the market for Lake Superior fish. In 1842, the company declared bankruptcy.

Following bankruptcy, Crooks continued to operate a clearing house for furs in New York City until his death.

== Personal life ==
Crooks left a large amount of correspondence. He suffered of ill health throughout his life.

While traveling for the fur trade company he dealt with many Native American tribes. He married Abanokue, the daughter of an Ojibwa Chieftain. They had a daughter together, Hester Crooks. Abanokue died around 1825. Crooks then married Emilie Pratte and had nine children. He spent his final days in New York.
