= William Crooks (colonel) =

American colonel, representative and railroader

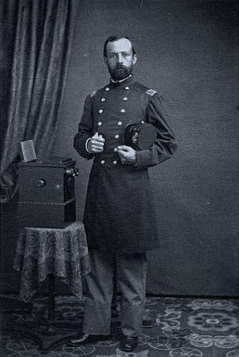

Personal details
- Born: June 20, 1832 New York City, US
- Died: December 17, 1907 (aged 75) Portland, Oregon, US
- Resting place: Oakland Cemetery, Saint Paul, MN
- Spouse(s): Arabella Crooks, Harriet Marie Crooks
- Relations: Ramsay Crooks (father)
- Children: 4

Military service
- Allegiance: United States • Union
- Branch/service: Union Army
- Years of service: 1862–1864
- Rank: Colonel
- Battles/wars: American Civil War; Siege of Spanish Fort (March 26 – April 8, 1865); Battle of Fort Blakeley (April 9, 1865); U.S.-Dakota War of 1862; Battle of Birch Coulee (September 2–3, 1862); Battle of Wood Lake (September 23, 1862); Sibley's 1863 Campaign; Battle of Big Mound (July 24, 1863); Battle of Dead Buffalo Lake (July 26, 1863); Battle of Stony Lake (July 28, 1863)

Member of the Minnesota Senate

Member of the U.S. House of Representatives from 's 23rd district district
- In office 1881–1883

Member of the Minnesota House of Representatives

Member of the U.S. House of Representatives from 's 23rd district district
- In office 1875–1878

William Crooks (June 20, 1832 – December 17, 1907) was a Colonel during the American Civil War, member of the Minnesota House of Representatives, U.S. Military Academy graduate, and a veteran railroader. He led the 6th Regiment Minnesota Volunteer Infantry from August 1862 to October 1864, mainly contending against the Sioux. Crooks built the first rail line in the State of Minnesota, the St. Paul & Pacific. His first locomotive he named for himself the William Crooks 4-4-0 and began its operation in 1861. His operation was taken over by James J. Hill. The William Crooks would become the first locomotive of Hill's Great Northern Railroad, and he would serve as the naming inspiration for one of the communities it passed through, Crookston, Minnesota.

== Early life and career ==
William Crooks was one of nine children born to Ramsay Crooks and Emilie Pratte. His father, Ramsay Crooks, was one of the most prominent figures in the North American fur trade, who had served as general manager of the American Fur Company working alongside founder John Jacob Astor from 1817, and as president after Astor retired in 1834. His mother, Emilie Pratte, was the daughter of Bernard Pratte, a partner in the company's Western department.

When William Crooks was seventeen, he enrolled at West Point and graduated in the department of Civil Engineers. (class of 1854). In 1852, William Crooks began his career as an engineer with Morris & Essex Road. From 1853 to 1855 he was assistant engineer for the Michigan Southern & Northern Indiana, and shortly after he occupied a similar position with the New York State Canal from 1855 to 1857. At the same time from 1859 to 1862, Crooks was also chief engineer at St. Paul & Pacific Railroad. Crooks then served the following two years as assistant engineer for the Minnesota & Pacific Railroad. Over the next 38 years, Crooks came to Portland as assistant to A. L. Mohler, general manager of the O.R. & N and was associated with other railroads in various capacities. From 1862 to 1865, he was Colonel of the 6th Minnesota Infantry Regiment with the Union Army. In 1869 Crooks engaged in railroad contract work until 1890. The following two years until 1892 he was president and chief engineer of Wadena & Park Rapids Railroad. His final job was chief engineer at Minneapolis & St. Louis Railroad that lasted three years until 1895. During his life, Colonel Crooks was recognized as one of the best railroaders in the country.

== Civil War ==
On August 19, 1862, Minnesota Governor Alexander Ramsey went to William Crooks's office at the St. Paul & Pacific Railroad Company to inform him of the massacre at the Lower Sioux Agency, and urged him to go to Fort Snelling at once to take command of the citizens who had volunteered to relieve and defend the settlers who had been attacked by Dakota warriors. Crooks consented, and was initially tendered an officer's commission as lieutenant colonel of the 7th Minnesota Infantry Regiment. After taking command of his men, Crooks joined Colonel A.D. Nelson of the 6th Minnesota Infantry Regiment, who informed him that as a regular army officer, he did not want to report to the newly appointed Colonel Henry Hastings Sibley, a civilian, due to possible problems down the line with conflicting orders. Nelson returned to St. Paul and resigned, and the next morning, Crooks received his commission from the governor as colonel of the 6th.

Thereafter, Colonel Crooks served as colonel in the 6th Minnesota Volunteer Infantry Regiment and led five companies that fought against the Indians in the U.S.-Dakota War. Formed in Hokah, MN, the 6th Regiment was organized throughout the summer and fall of 1862 in response to President Abraham Lincoln's calls for a total of 600,000 additional troops. Over the course of the next two years, the regiment stayed in Minnesota due to the outbreak of the 1862 Dakota War despite the original plan to head south. Colonel Crooks was also president of a court-martial by which 100 Native American were condemned to death. His task was to bring about a revision of the findings of the bodies so that not more than 40 of the convicted Indians were executed. By the spring of 1864, the members of the Sixth Regiment were directed to carry on to Helena, Arkansas, on the Mississippi River. The Sixth Regiment, 950 total, arrived in Helena on June 23, 1864, and spent the next four months in unpredictable conditions. By this time, 58 enlisted men had died from malaria and over 650 people reported as sick. Finally in November, Colonel Crooks' troops were sent to fight under command of General E.R.S. Canby's campaign in Mobile, Alabama, and were in reserve during the April 9 capture of Fort Blakely. On August 19, 1865, William Crooks and his regiment returned home at last to Fort Snelling after a successful battle with the South.

== Death ==
For years of suffering from a kidney disease, William Crooks' condition became consistently worse until late 1907, when he contracted a severe cold. Many telegrams from prominent railroad officials throughout the country expressed sympathy for Crooks' family when he died at the age of 75 in Portland, Oregon. Crooks' funeral services were held in St. Paul days after his death, and his body was accompanied by his son and family. Colonel Crooks' engines used by the Northern Pacific Railway Company are still preserved in the car shops of the Hill system at St. Paul as a relic of the early railroad history of the country.
