= Battle of Wood Lake =

Final battle in U.S.–Dakota War of 1862

- Part of the Dakota War of 1862, American Civil War
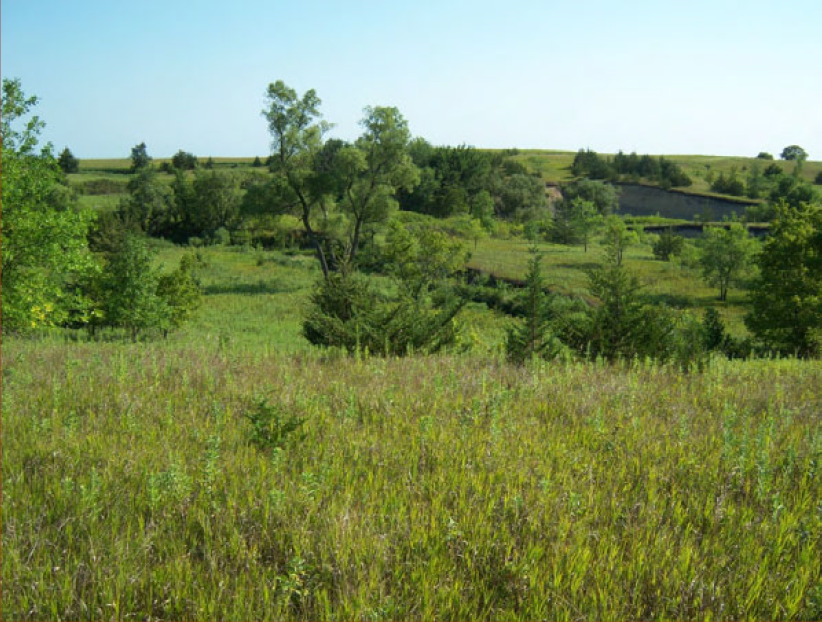
- Location of the positions of the Dakota along the bluffs north of the Minnesota Volunteers' camp
Date	September 23, 1862
Location	Yellow Medicine County, Minnesota 44°42′4″N 95°26′9″W
Result	United States victory

Belligerents
United States	Santee Sioux

Commanders and leaders
Col. Henry Hastings Sibley	Chief Little Crow; Mankato †; Big Eagle (surrendered); Rattling Runner (executed)

Strength
1,450–1,619	<738

Casualties and losses
7 killed 34–50 wounded	14–30 killed Unknown number wounded

The Battle of Wood Lake occurred on September 23, 1862, and was the final battle in the Dakota War of 1862. The two-hour battle, which actually took place at nearby Lone Tree Lake, was a decisive victory for the U.S. forces led by Colonel Henry Hastings Sibley. With heavy casualties inflicted on the Dakota forces led by Chief Little Crow, the "hostile" Dakota warriors dispersed. Little Crow and 150 followers fled for the northern plains, while other Mdewakantons quietly joined the "friendly" Dakota camp started by the Sisseton and Wahpeton bands, which would soon become known as Camp Release.

== Background ==
=== Pressure on Sibley ===
In early September 1862, the U.S. defeat at the Battle of Birch Coulee and the sieges at Hutchinson, Forest City and Fort Abercrombie caused further panic, as the exodus of Minnesota settlers continued. Both Governor Alexander Ramsey and Colonel Henry Hastings Sibley were criticized heavily for their failure to act more swiftly to protect them. Many Republican supporters of Governor Ramsey questioned his choice of former governor and Democrat Henry Sibley to lead the army, in scathing newspaper editorials that accused Sibley of excessive sympathy for the Dakota due to his extensive personal and business ties with them.

After repeated pleas from Governor Ramsey, the U.S. government started to take the conflict in Minnesota more seriously. On September 6, 1862, Secretary of War Edwin Stanton created the new Military Department of the Northwest and appointed General John Pope to command it; Pope himself finally reached Minnesota on September 16. Stanton told Pope to "employ whatever force may be necessary" to defeat the Dakota. Pope, anxious to vindicate himself following his defeat at the Second Battle of Bull Run, proceeded to put pressure on Sibley to move forcefully against the Dakota, but struggled to secure more troops to support the war effort.

The new recruits that Sibley had managed to organize were woefully lacking in experience, and he faced shortage of food, guns, ammunition and clothing. Many of these supplies finally reached Sibley's forces between September 11 and 14. On September 19, after two days of heavy rain, Sibley left Fort Ridgely with his entire command as they began their march up the Minnesota River valley. Estimates of the size of his command at this time range from 1,450 to 1,619 men.

By the time Sibley and his troops had reached Lone Tree Lake on September 22, they were running very low on food. Famished, it was no wonder that several members of the "unruly" 3rd Minnesota Infantry Regiment were tempted to forage for potatoes at the Upper Sioux Agency on the morning on September 23, unwittingly triggering what came to be known as the Battle of Wood Lake.

=== Communication between Sibley and Little Crow ===
After the Battle of Birch Coulee, Colonel Sibley had left a message for Little Crow in a cigar box attached to a stake in the battleground, opening a dialogue between the two camps.

In a letter written for him by Antoine Joseph Campbell around September 10, Little Crow hinted to Sibley that he might be willing to negotiate the release of the "one hundred and fifty-five prisoners" whom they had treated "just as well as us." His letter ended with a question: "I want to know from you as a friend, what way that I can make peace for my people?"

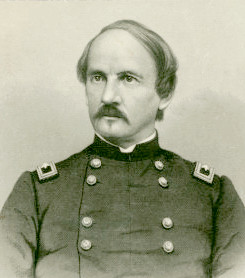
Colonel Henry Sibley

Although the safety of the prisoners was paramount to him, Sibley refused to negotiate with Little Crow. Based on intelligence shared by the "mixed blood" messengers who had delivered Little Crow's letters, Sibley understood that many Dakota were increasingly disillusioned with Little Crow, that some of his own warriors had plotted to kill him, and that the divisions among the Dakota would likely work to his advantage.

Unbeknownst to Little Crow, a few Mdewakanton chiefs including Wabasha, Wakute and Taopi had managed to smuggle a separate letter to Sibley, voicing their opposition to the war and offering their assistance. Sibley responded by assuring the chiefs: "I have not come into this upper country to injure any innocent person...but to punish those who have committed cruel murders upon innocent men, women and children."

With Sibley unwilling to open talks unless he released the prisoners, Little Crow became increasingly aware that he was running out of options.

=== Dakota war council ===
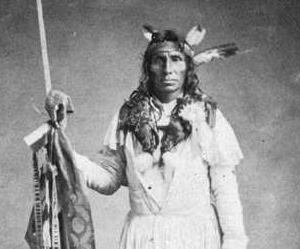
Taoyateduta Little Crow

Little Crow (Taoyateduta) received word that Sibley's troops had reached the Lower Sioux Agency and would reach the area below Yellow Medicine around September 21. Runners were reporting Sibley's movements every few hours.

On the morning of September 22, Little Crow's soldiers' lodge ordered all able-bodied men to march south to the Yellow Medicine River. Little Crow's camp crier announced rewards for anyone bringing back the scalps of Sibley, Joseph R. Brown, William H. Forbes, Louis Robert or Nathan Myrick, or the American flag. While hundreds of soldiers marched willingly, many more went because they felt under duress from the soldiers' lodge headed by Cut Nose (Marpiya Okinajin); they were also joined by a contingent from the "friendly" Dakota camp who sought to prevent a surprise attack on Sibley's army.

A total of 738 men were counted when they reached a point a few miles from Lone Tree Lake, where they had learned that Sibley's army had set up camp.

A council was held to discuss the plan of attack. Little Crow sought to motivate the warriors by saying, "We are many and strong. This plan will not only secure for us an easy victory but lots of plunder, especially provisions. Remember the starving ones at home." He proceeded to argue that Sibley's army could be taken easily if they surrounded the camp under the cover of darkness and stated, "I have just been to the edge of the bluff and looked over and saw to my astonishment but a few tipis there; only five officers' tents."

However, Gabriel Renville (Tiwakan) and Solomon Two Stars, two leaders from the "friendly" Dakota camp who had refused to participate in previous battles, argued vehemently against the plan. Renville said that he had been up to the same bluff and that there were far more troops than Little Crow had said. He pointed out that Sibley's army had "spy-glasses" and had probably already seen them, and were ready with their big guns. Two Stars ridiculed Little Crow's plan and said it was cowardly, "so cowardly as to be unworthy of a Dakota brave and of the great chief who proposed it." He also said that attacking at night would mean they would not have the support of the "friendlies": "I do not think your attack is a good one, because if the attack is made at night, only part of us will go, and many will not go. Your plan would therefore fail." Renville and Two Stars deliberately prolonged the debate, trying to delay the attack until morning, when they would have a better chance of warning Sibley's troops.

The leaders of Little Crow's soldiers' lodge struggled to arrive at a consensus. However, Solomon Two Stars had suggested that it was better to attack Sibley's soldiers from close range when they were marching, as it was a battle tactic that had worked well for the Tetons (Lakota). One of the leaders of the fight, Rattling Runner (Rdainyanka), son-in-law of Chief Wabasha, agreed that this was the best plan and said that they should "lie still" that night and attack at daylight. Strung out along the road, the troops would be in a long, poorly defended column as they marched. Upon learning that Sibley's troops had thrown up breastworks to fortify the campsite, the leaders of the "hostile" Dakota soldiers' lodge finally agreed that it was unsafe to attack them at the lake at night, and developed a plan to attack the troops on the road early in the morning.

== Battle ==
=== Campsite at Lone Tree Lake ===
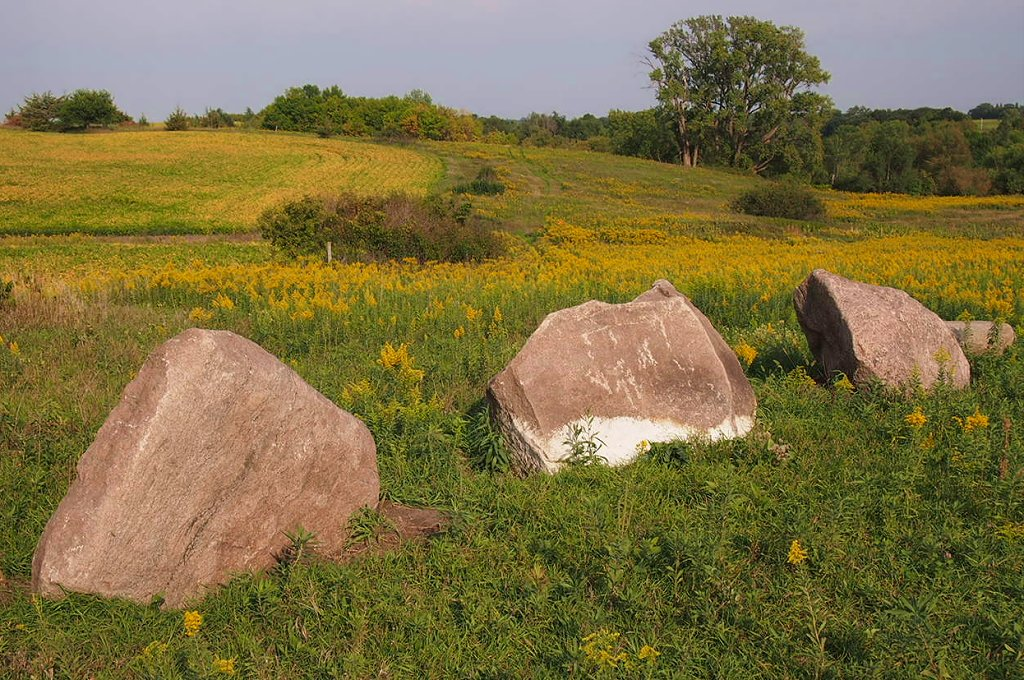
Wood Lake Battlefield

On September 22, Colonel Sibley's troops had camped east of Lone Tree or Battle Lake, a small lake drained by a creek running northeast to the Minnesota River, about five miles north of what is now Echo, Minnesota. (Historians have concluded that "the battle was simply named for the largest lake in the vicinity," Wood Lake, which is about three miles southwest of the battle site. In his narrative of the war, Big Eagle suggested that the reason for the battle being "misnamed" was that the old Dakota name for Lone Tree Lake had been "M'da-chan," meaning "Wood Lake".)

The 3rd Minnesota Infantry Regiment camped along the crest south of the creek, and the 6th Minnesota was next to the small lake to the left. The 7th Minnesota was at the right rear behind the creek's ravine. All units and the wagon train and artillery were partially enclosed by trenches.

Sibley planned to meet Little Crow's forces further north, in the open plains above the Yellow Medicine River, where he believed his better equipped forces with their rifled muskets and artillery with exploding shells would have an advantage against the Dakota with their double-barreled shotguns. His plan for the following day was to "cross the wooded Yellow Medicine River valley and go to the ruined Upper Sioux Agency using the Government Road."

=== Dakota battle plan and positions ===
The Dakota battle plan was to attack Sibley's troops as they were marching a mile or more to the northwest of the lake, along the road leading to the Upper Sioux Agency.

Big Eagle (Wambditanka) later explained: "At the point determined on we planned to hide a large number of men on the side of the road. Near the lake, in a ravine formed by the outlet, we were to place another strong body. Behind a hill to the west were to be some more men. We thought that when Sibley marched out along the road, and when the head of his column had reached the farther end of the line of our first division, our men would open fire. The men in the ravine would then be in the rear of the whites and would begin firing on that end of the column. The men from behind the hill would rush out and attack the flank, and then we had horsemen far out on the right and left who would come up. We expected to throw the whole white force into confusion by the sudden and unexpected attack, and defeat them before they could rally. I think this was a good plan of battle... We felt this would be the deciding fight of the war."

On the night of September 22, Little Crow and the Dakota chiefs carefully moved their soldiers into position, often with a clear view of Sibley's troops, who were unaware of their presence. Big Eagle recalled, "We could hear them laughing and singing."

Big Eagle was confident that the plan would work: "Our concealed men would not have been discovered. The grass was tall, and the place by the road and the ravine were good hiding places. We had learned that Sibley was not particular about sending out scouts and examining the country before he passed it. He had a number of mounted men, but they always rode together, at the head of the column, when on a march, and did not examine the ground at the sides of the road."

Once the preparations were complete, Little Crow, Big Eagle and the other chiefs went to the hill to the west so they would have a better view of the fighting. Meanwhile, Dakota fighters lay in the grass along the side of the road with tufts of grass woven into their headdresses for disguise, waiting patiently for daybreak.

=== Third Minnesota Infantry Regiment ===
The "wild card" among Sibley's troops was the 3rd Minnesota Infantry Regiment. The 270 men of the 3rd Minnesota in his command had suffered an embarrassing defeat by the Confederates in the First Battle of Murfreesboro, Tennessee, on July 13, 1862, when Colonel Henry C. Lester had decided to surrender instead of going to the aid of one of their detachments which had been attacked. The vast majority of the regiment disagreed with the surrender. The 3rd Minnesota was then sent to St. Louis, Missouri to be paroled; the regiment was part of a formal prisoner exchange on August 27, 1862, and was sent back to Minnesota.

With the outbreak of the Dakota War, the men of the 3rd Minnesota saw an opportunity to prove themselves, and Colonel Sibley had high hopes for his experienced Civil War veterans. However, the 3rd Minnesota had lost most of their officers who were still held prisoner by the Confederates, except for Lieutenant Rollin C. Olin. Upon reaching Fort Snelling, Major Abraham E. Welch, formerly of the 1st Minnesota Infantry Regiment, had been assigned as their commander.

Ezra T. Champlin, who fought in the battle as a non-commissioned officer, later conceded, "I may as well state here that the Third, galled by a humiliating surrender at Murfreesborough, Tenn., by a recreant and cowardly commander, had lost in a great measure their former high discipline, and were quite unruly, anxious only to redeem in the field their wounded honor."

The 3rd Minnesota Infantry Regiment had acquired potatoes as they had passed through farmland at the Lower Sioux Agency, and had nearly run out by the time they reached Lone Tree Lake. On the morning of the September 23, a group of 3rd Regiment soldiers took it upon themselves to venture out to replenish their supply.

=== The attack ===
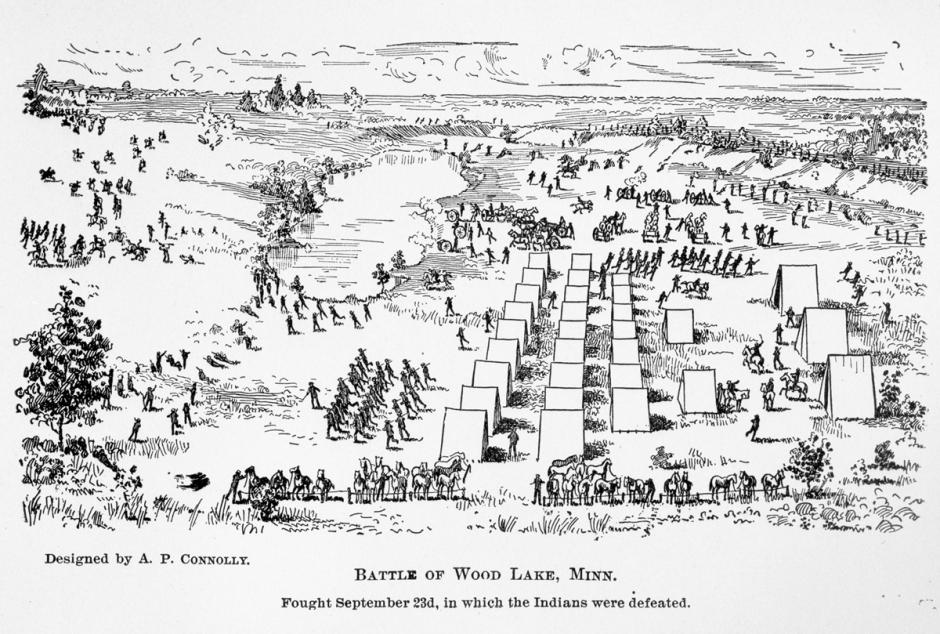
Battle of Wood Lake, 1862

Reveille at Sibley's campsite was sounded at 4 am on September 23, "in order to march early and to be ready for any emergency." The Dakota forces lying in wait had expected Sibley's troops to start marching early in the morning.

Instead, at about 7 am, while other units were still having breakfast, a group of soldiers from the 3rd Minnesota Infantry Regiment left camp in four or five wagons, driven by teamsters with four men in each wagon, in an unauthorized trip to forage for potatoes at the Upper Sioux Agency by present-day Rock Valle Church.

About half a mile from camp, after crossing the bridge over the creek to the other side of the ravine and going about a hundred yards over the high prairie, their lead wagon was attacked by a squad of 25 Dakota warriors who sprung up and began shooting, mortally wounding Private Degrove Kimball and wounding several others. Big Eagle explained that some of the wagons were not on the road, and were headed straight at the Dakota warriors as they lay waiting in the grass; the men in position had no choice but to get up and fire to avoid being run over. George Quinn (Wakandayamani), who was in the ravine in a line crossed by the foraging soldiers, recalled that "a dog with the soldiers barked at our men as they lay in the grass and so they were discovered."

Private William McGee of Company G sprang out of the lead wagon and returned fire; the soldiers in the rear wagons started shooting; and the Battle of Wood Lake had begun. Big Eagle said, "This brought on the fight, of course, but not according to the way we had planned it. Little Crow saw it and felt very badly."

The shots were heard from the campsite. Not waiting for orders from Sibley, Major Abraham E. Welch led 200 men of the 3rd Minnesota Infantry Regiment to the right of the initial attack and toward the Dakota forces, which were quickly gathering in number. About half the regiment was held as a reserve; the rest advanced as a line of skirmishers.

Captain Ezra T. Champlin recalled, "Our thorough drill in the South showed here to good advantage; our skirmish line moved steadily forward, firing rapidly, forcing the enemy back toward the bluffs of the Minnesota river." From the standpoint of the reserve, he could see that the Dakota warriors "formed a semi-circle in our front, and to right and left, moving about with great activity, howling like demons, firing and retreating, their quick movements seeming to multiply their numbers. We were whipping them in fine shape, driving them back over the undulating prairie."

As firing progressed in musket range, Little Crow "rode out a short distance from a mounted group, and, swinging his blanket above his head, gave the war-whoop, when an answering yell rang from the prairie, and scores of Indians, not before seen, rose from the grass, 'until,' as one who was present states, 'the whole prairie seemed to be alive with them.'"

=== Retreat of the Third Minnesota ===
The 3rd Minnesota advanced about one mile from the camp until Colonel Sibley, fearing disaster, sent an officer to order them to retreat, creating significant confusion. Welch at first refused, but relented as more Dakota fighters appeared, and the officer returned with direct orders to "positively fall back."

Champlin recounted: "The reserve about-faced; the skirmishers on the right came running in on the reserve. Sergeants McDonald and Bowler on the left kept the line of skirmishers steady, fighting their way back to the reserve. The battle from this point, about one mile from the camp, back over the line over which we had just moved, was disordered and independent, each man doing his best... A continuous fusillade was poured into their converging ranks... Our line of retreat lay down a descent to the creek we had crossed, with rolling hills on either side, and here was pandemonium itself, – with Indians to the right of us, Indians to the left of us, Indians behind us, charging and yelling."

As the 3rd Regiment retreated across the creek and regained the steep bank of the ravine toward their camp, Major Welch was struck by a ball and broke his leg, and was carried one-quarter mile back to camp, then left on a hill to where he could watch the fighting.

=== Reinforcements and artillery ===
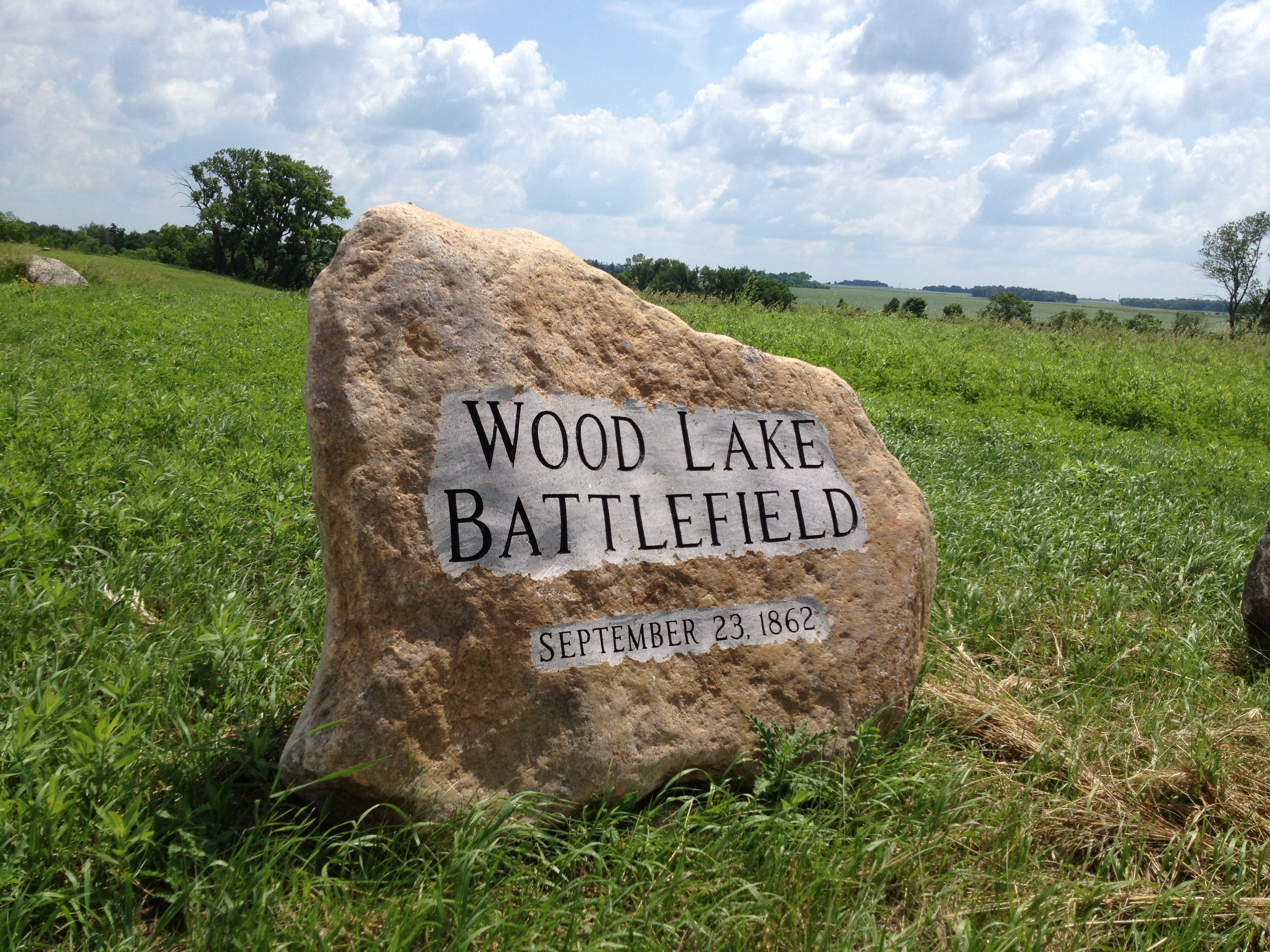
Boulder at Wood Lake Battlefield

Once they had retreated back across the creek, the men of the 3rd Minnesota Infantry Regiment were joined by forty Renville Rangers, a unit of "nearly all mixed-bloods" under Lieutenant James Gorman, sent by Sibley to reinforce them. Sibley's men made a stand on the plateau between the ravine and the camp, with the Dakota warriors "taking advantage of the low hills bordering the narrow intervals along the creek."

Ignoring Sibley's orders to retreat, the men of the 3rd Minnesota once again turned north. According to Champlin, "At this time, Lieutenant Olin of the Third, with about fifty men, made a wild charge...completely routing those in our front. This charge was so sudden and unexpected by them that we came nearly to a hand-to-hand encounter. Fourteen or fifteen were here killed and fell into our hands, they having no time to carry them away... Above the din of musketry and the warwhoops of the Indians, I remember the hoarse voice of Sergt. J. M. Bowler, roaring like a madman: 'Remember Murfreesborough! Fight, boys! Remember Murfreesborough!'"

The leader of Quinn's party, Killing Hawk, was killed and eight more of the thirteen men in their squad were shot.

Seeing that Dakota forces were now passing down the ravine to try to outflank their men on the right, Sibley ordered Lieutenant Colonel William Rainey Marshall, with five companies of the 7th Minnesota Infantry Regiment and a six-pounder artillery piece under Captain Hendricks, to advance to the north side of the camp; he also ordered two companies from the 6th Minnesota Infantry Regiment to reinforce them.

Colonel Marshall ordered Captain James Gilfillan with Company H of the 7th Regiment, who had been on guard, to place half his men in the rifle-pits that had been dug to protect the camp, and to advance the rest of his men as skirmishers on the extreme right of their line. Marshall lengthened his line to the right of the gun and slightly forward, facing the ravine occupied by Dakota forces. Marshall stated in his report, "Gradually advancing the line, the men keeping close to the ground and firing as they crawled forward, I gained a good position from which to charge the Indians. Here we were joined by Captain Grant's company of the Sixth Regiment, and charged, successfully dislodging the Indians." Leaving behind two companies with the artillery, Marshall led his men to pursue the Dakota forces beyond the ravine until they were recalled by Sibley and instructed to gather up the bodies of the fallen Dakota.

On the extreme left, Sibley ordered Major Robert N. McLaren with Company F from the 6th Regiment under Captain Horace B. Wilson to "double-quick around the south side of the little lake near the camp, and take possession of a ridge overlooking a ravine" about one mile away, where a large number of Dakota were positioned for a flanking attack. There, Captain Wilson was wounded in the shoulder, but the company kept the Dakota party at bay and finally drove them back.

According to Chief Big Eagle: "The Indians that were in the fight did well, but hundreds of our men did not get into it and did not fire a shot. They were out too far. The men in the ravine and the line connecting them with those on the road did the most of the fighting. Those of us on the hill did our best, but we were soon driven off... The whites drove our men out of the ravine by a charge and that ended the battle."

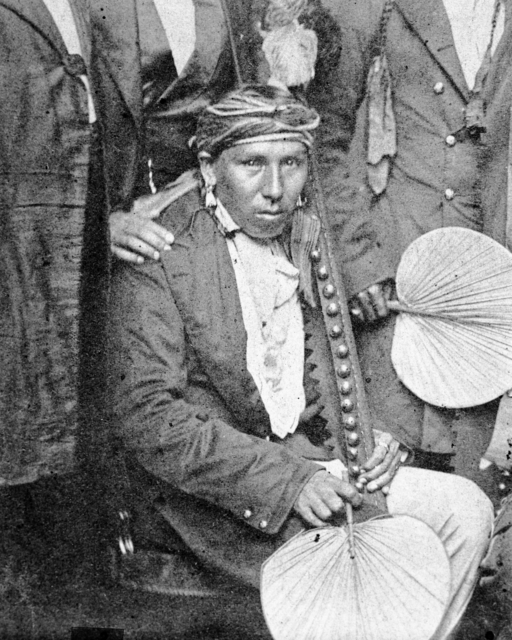
Mankato was killed by a cannonball at the Battle of Wood Lake on September 23, 1862

=== Retreat of the Dakota ===
In Sibley's official report on September 23, 1862, he stated: "The battle raged for about two hours, the six-pounder and the mountain howitzer being used with great effect, when the Indians, repulsed at all points with great loss, retired with precipitation. I regret to state that many casualties occurred on our side...Four of our men were killed and between thirty-five and forty were wounded, most of them, I rejoice to hear, not seriously."

Chief Mankato had been killed by a cannonball that he refused to dodge. According to Big Eagle, "Mankato was killed here, and we lost a very good and brave war chief. He was killed by a cannon ball that was so nearly spent that he was not afraid of it, and it struck him in the back, as he lay on the ground, and killed him."

Sibley decided not to pursue the Dakota forces as they retreated, as "he lacked the cavalry to make a vigorous pursuit." Big Eagle later recalled, "We retreated in some disorder, though the whites did not offer to pursue us. We crossed a wide prairie, but their horsemen did not follow us."

The bodies of fourteen Dakota were buried by Sibley's troops on the field of battle. According to Big Eagle, the Dakota "lost fourteen or fifteen men killed and quite a number wounded. Some of the wounded died afterwards, but I do not know how many. We carried off no dead bodies, but took away all our wounded." However, George Quinn (Wakandayamani) later noted, "Mankato's body was buried back at our camp, I think."

Upon learning that some of the fourteen fallen Dakota had been scalped by his soldiers, Colonel Sibley "expressed his stern disapproval and promised severe punishment to any men who repeated such treatment," writing: "The bodies of the dead, even of a savage enemy shall not be subjected to indignities by civilized & christian men."

== Aftermath ==
The Battle of Wood Lake was a decisive victory for the United States, with heavy casualties inflicted on the Dakota. After the battle on September 23, 1862, Colonel Henry Hastings Sibley wrote in a letter to his wife that the Dakota had received "a severe blow" and that he was confident they "will not dare to make another stand." The battle marked the end of organized warfare for the Dakota in Minnesota, although conflict would continue the following year as Sibley pursued the Sioux leaders who had fled north. The U.S. victory at Wood Lake also paved the way for 269 prisoners – nearly all women and children, many of whom had been held hostage for more than five weeks – to be released at Camp Release, and for many Dakota warriors to surrender with the understanding that Sibley would only punish those who had participated in murdering innocents. For his part in the battle, Sibley was later promoted to brigadier general of volunteers in the Union Army by President Abraham Lincoln.

=== Little Crow's defeat and retreat ===
It was the last major battle fought by the Dakota, many of whom were already disillusioned with Little Crow's leadership. Upon returning to camp on September 23, Little Crow was described as "despondent" and "almost heart broken." Outside his lodge, he gave a bitter speech, recounted by Samuel J. Brown:

"Seven hundred picked warriors whipped by the cowardly whites. Better run away and scatter out over the plains like buffalo and wolves. To be sure, the whites had big guns and better arms than the Indians and outnumbered us four or five to one, but that is no reason we should not have whipped them, for we are brave men while they are cowardly women. I cannot account for the disgraceful defeat. It must be the work of traitors in our midst."

In referring to "traitors in our midst," it was clear that Little Crow was accusing the "friendly" Dakota. A few Mdewakantons argued that the "hostile" Dakota should attack the "friendly" Dakota camp, which had rescued most of the white and "mixed-blood" prisoners during the Battle of Wood Lake. Anticipating an attack, the "friendlies" had dug trenches in the center of their lodges, in which they hid the prisoners for protection. Little Crow had initially sympathized with those who wanted to attack, but wished above all else to avoid a tribal civil war against his relatives. According to Antoine Joseph Campbell, Little Crow also concluded that it would do no good to harm any more white civilians, saying:

"[It would be] bad policy, for the whites will then follow us to the end of the earth and give us no peace... It would be cruel and cowardly too."

Antoine Joseph Campbell delivered a final message from Colonel Sibley demanding Little Crow's unconditional surrender, to which Taoyateduta "laughed derisively" and said, "The long merchant Sibley would like to put the rope around my neck, but he won't get the chance." Campbell then asked Little Crow to release the remaining captives in his camp. Little Crow agreed, and Campbell later reported that 46 captives had been released to him, but some of Little Crow's followers ignored his orders and kept captives for several months afterwards. Little Crow had shamed some of the men who resisted into releasing their hostages, saying:

"Let them alone. Too many women and children have been killed already. If you had killed only men, we could make peace now."

The "hostile" Dakota camp packed up and dispersed. Chief Little Crow and 150 to 250 followers fled to the northern plains, including Chiefs Shakopee III, Red Middle Voice and Medicine Bottle II. Meanwhile, other Mdewakantons joined the "friendly" Dakota camp in the days that followed on the basis of Sibley's earlier promise that only those who had participated in the murder of settlers would be punished. The "friendly" Dakota camp led by Gabriel Renville and other leaders had taken a growing number of "white" and "mixed-blood" captives under their protection, finally releasing them to Colonel Sibley's army at Camp Release on September 26, 1862.

== Units ==
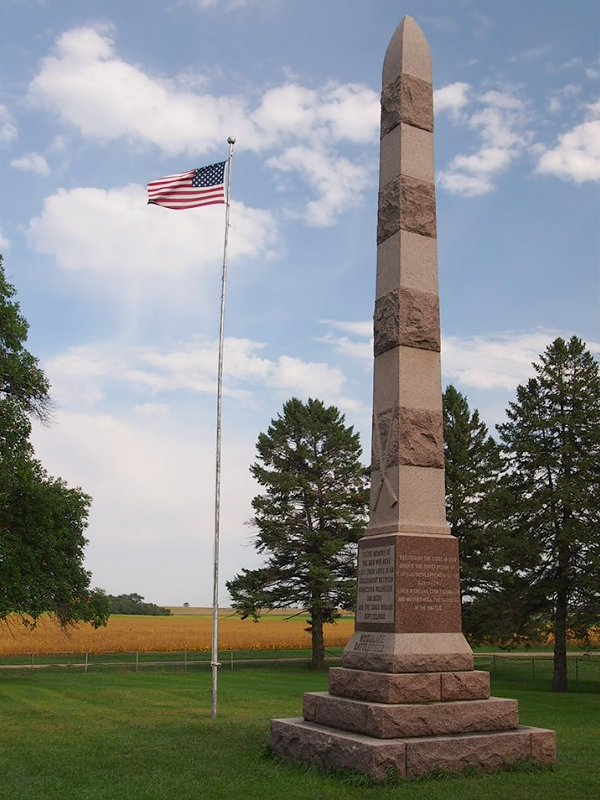
Wood Lake Monument

=== Army and citizen soldier units ===
Units involved in the Battle of Wood Lake include: the 3rd Minnesota Infantry Regiment, nine companies of the 6th Minnesota Infantry, five companies of the 7th Minnesota Infantry, one company of the 9th Minnesota Infantry, a detachment of the 10th Minnesota Infantry, 38 to 45 Renville Rangers, 28 mounted citizen guards, and 16 citizen-artillerists. The adjutant general of Minnesota, in his official report after the battle, stated: "As the hottest of the enemy's fire was borne by the Third Regiment and the Renville Rangers, the heaviest part of the loss was confined to those troops." A large number of U.S. soldiers were held in a position of defense and did not engage in battle.

==== Casualties ====
In 1907 or 1908, the Minnesota Commission on the Wood Lake Battlefield reported that in addition to the four U.S. soldiers buried in the field, three more had been mortally wounded and died soon afterward, for a total of seven U.S. soldiers killed. Four soldiers from the 3rd Minnesota Infantry Regiment were killed on the battlefield or mortally wounded; one Renville Ranger was killed; and one soldier each from the 6th and 7th Minnesota Infantry Regiments were killed also. According to the Minnesota Commission on the Wood Lake Battlefield and the Renville Rangers/Pioneer Association, Minnesota in the Civil and Indian Wars erroneously listed Joseph Paro (Perrault) as having been killed at Wood Lake; the man killed belonging to the Rangers was Ernest Paul (name printed incorrectly as "Pole"). The commission's Report on the Battle of Wood Lake states that a total of 34 U.S. soldiers were wounded, many seriously, while historian Gary Clayton Anderson estimates that the number of wounded was closer to 50.

==== Dakota scouts in Sibley's command ====
In total, there were an estimated 10 to 20 Dakota and "mixed blood" men serving in Sibley's command as scouts. One of them was John Otherday (Ampatutokacha), who had helped 62 settlers escape from the Upper Sioux Agency, after which he joined Sibley's army. Another was Simon Anawangmani, who had stayed in Sibley's camp after helping Mrs. John Newman and her three children escape to Fort Ridgely on September 11. During the battle, Anawangmani ran onto the battlefield waving a white flag as he tried to coax Dakota fighters into defecting. At one point Anawangmani approached his own son and was quickly surrounded by "hostiles" who debated killing him, but was protected by some of his own men who were there. Both Otherday and Anawangmani are commemorated by the Faithful Indians' Monument next to the Birch Coulee State Monument.

Iron Walker (Mazomani), a Wahpeton Dakota who had been an advocate of peace, had tried to cross over to Simon Anawangmani carrying a flag of truce during the fighting, but his leg was blown off by a cannonball. Mazomani was carried away from the battlefield to his camp, where he died from his wounds the following morning. The Minnesota Historical Society erected a historical marker at Mazomani's gravesite in 1984.

=== Dakota forces ===
According to Samuel J. Brown, 738 Dakota had reached the Wood Lake battlefield as reported by Chief Little Crow to Brown's mother, Susan Frenier Brown, in his presence. The number had been determined by counting sticks which had been handed out to each warrior on the road leading to the battleground, which were then collected at "Yellow Medicine bottoms," a few miles from where the battle took place. Historian Gary Clayton Anderson notes that "Even so, the Mdewakantons seemed to know that many of those men were going simply to placate the akacita leaders or to watch events."

Furthermore, at the conclusion of the war council on September 22, Gabriel Renville quietly sent word for the "friendly" Dakota who did not actually intend to fight to gather in a ravine further west, where they slept. In the morning, while the "hostiles" were fighting in the Battle of Wood Lake, Solomon Two Stars and the other "friendlies" headed back to their camp, which was 12 to 15 miles away. The friendlies rescued prisoners from the "hostile" camp during the battle and prepared for possible combat with the hostiles upon their return.

Of the Dakota who remained with Little Crow's forces, Chief Big Eagle estimated that "hundreds" did not get involved or fire a single shot during the actual battle, simply because they were too far out. In his report to General John Pope on September 27, 1862, Colonel Henry Hastings Sibley revised his estimate of the number of Dakota who fought in the Battle of Wood Lake, stating that "the hostiles actually engaged in the fight were nearly five hundred instead of three hundred."

==== Casualties ====
Although Sibley's troops found and buried only 14 Dakota warriors on the battlefield, Antoine Joseph Campbell, who was at Little Crow's side through much of the war, later reported that closer to 30 Dakota had been killed. The casualties included Chief Mankato and Killing Hawk, who were both killed during the battle.

== Battlefield preservation ==
On July 30, 2010, the battlefield site was listed on the National Register of Historic Places as the Wood Lake Battlefield Historic District for having state-level significance under the themes Archaeology/Historic-Aboriginal, Archaeology/Historic-Non-Aboriginal, Ethnic Heritage/Native American, and Military. It was nominated as the final engagement of the Dakota War of 1862, a watershed period for the state of Minnesota and the Dakota people, and for embodying early commemoration efforts of 1907–1910, culminating in the stone monument. The Wood Lake Battlefield Preservation Association, in partnership with the American Battlefield Protection Program (ABPP) of the National Park Service, and the American Battlefield Trust, have acquired and preserved 240 acres of the Wood Lake battlefield. A one-acre roadside commemorative area containing a granite obelisk monument is owned by the Minnesota Historical Society.
