= Saint Paul and Pacific Railroad =

Overview
- Headquarters: Saint Paul, Minnesota
- Locale: Minnesota, United States
- Founder: William Crooks
- Dates of operation: 1857–1879
- Successor: Great Northern Railway

Technical
- Track gauge: 4 ft 8 1/2 in (1,435 mm) standard gauge

The Saint Paul and Pacific Railroad (also known as the St. Paul & Pacific Railroad and the SP&P) was a shortline railroad in the state of Minnesota in the United States which existed from 1857 to 1879. Founded as the Minnesota and Pacific Railroad, it was the state's first active railroad. It went bankrupt, and the state changed its name to the Saint Paul and Pacific Railroad. The SP&P went bankrupt as well. It was taken over by James Jerome Hill and others, who used the railroad as the basis for building the Great Northern Railway.

== Early history ==
In 1857, the territorial legislature of the state of Minnesota issued a charter to the Minnesota and Pacific Railroad to build a standard gauge railway from Stillwater in the east to St. Paul in the west. From St. Paul, the main line would extend to Breckenridge in the west (the state's border with the Dakota Territory), while a branch line would extend to St. Cloud, Crow Wing, and St. Vincent. As the state's first active railroad (though not necessarily the state's first railroad), the Minnesota and Pacific received a grant of 2,460,000 acres (1,000,000 ha) of land from the territorial legislature. This was the seventh largest land grant of the 75 given to railroads nationwide between 1850 and 1871.

Construction began in the autumn of 1856, and in 1857 the state backed a $5 million (equivalent to $173 million in 2025) bond issue to support the new rail system. But speculators manipulated the nascent railroad's profits, overcharged it for supplies, and sold off some of its assets. It went bankrupt in 1860, and the new state legislature purchased all of its assets for a mere $1,000 (equivalent to $35,833 in 2025).

== Saint Paul and Pacific ==
In 1862, the state legislature reorganized the bankrupt railroad as the St. Paul and Pacific Railroad. That same year, 10 miles (16 km) of track between St. Paul and St. Anthony finally opened. Egbert E. Litchfield bought most of the road's stock, and while the branch line reached Sauk Rapids by 1867 (financed mostly by bonds sold in the Netherlands) little was accomplished on the main line. Only 210 miles (340 km) of track had been laid as of 1865. The railroad built almost no more track between 1867 and 1871. Nonetheless, it heavily promoted the construction of towns every 8 miles (13 km) along its length, and was the leading railroad helping to "colonize" Minnesota.

In December 1870, the Northern Pacific Railway purchased the SP&P. But the Northern Pacific went bankrupt in the Panic of 1873, and E. Darwin Litchfield (Egbert's brother) bought the SP&P back from the bigger road. Dutch investors held most of the road's stock, and forced Litchfield to allow a receiver to manage the system. For three more years, little was done by the receiver.

But James J. Hill, who ran steamboats on the Red River, knew that the SP&P owned very valuable land grants and saw the potential of the railroad. Hill convinced John S. Kennedy (a New York City banker who had represented the Dutch bondholders), Norman Kittson (Hill's friend and a wealthy fur trader), Donald Smith (a Montreal banker and executive with the Hudson's Bay Company), and George Stephen (Smith's cousin and a wealthy railroad executive) to invest $5.5 million (equivalent to $183 million in 2025) in purchasing the railroad. On March 13, 1878, the Dutch formally signed an agreement transferring their bonds to the investors group and giving them control of the railroad.

To finance construction of the SP&P, the road issued bonds that allowed the bearer to receive up to $10,000 per mile of track completed (equivalent to $333,621 in 2025), but only if the line was finished. In February 1879, the group bought out the Litchfields with cash and bonds in the new company. The SP&P showed a $500,000 profit for 1878 (equivalent to $16,681,034 in 2025), and in March 1879 two different courts finally approved the company's emergence from bankruptcy.

== Demise and future ownership ==
On May 23, 1879, the key investors in the railroad formed a new company, the St. Paul, Minneapolis and Manitoba Railway (StPM&M), to take over the assets of the SP&P. It did so in June 1879, bringing an end to the existence of the St. Paul and Pacific.

On September 18, 1889, Hill changed the name of the Minneapolis and St. Cloud Railway (a railroad which existed primarily on paper, but which held extensive land grants throughout the Midwest and Pacific Northwest) to the Great Northern Railway. On February 1, 1890, he transferred ownership of the StPM&M, Montana Central Railway, and other rail systems he owned to the Great Northern.

Starting in 2018, Minnesota-based Progressive Rail Corp. runs freight trains in Santa Cruz County, California under the same name St. Paul and Pacific and with the same reporting marks SP&P/SPP.

== Bibliography ==
- Dreiser, Theodore. Tragic America. London: Constable, 1931.
- Fitzsimmons, Bernard. 150 Years of North American Railroads. Hadley Woods, Hertfordshire, U.K.: Winchmore, 1982.
- Ingham, John N. "Litchfield, Paul Weeks." In Biographical Dictionary of American Business Leaders. Westport, Conn.: Greenwood Press, 1983.
- Lovoll, Odd S. Norwegians on the Prairie: Ethnicity and the Development of the Country Town. St. Paul: Minnesota Historical Society, 2007.
- Malone, Michael P. (1996). James J. Hill: Empire Builder of the Northwest. Norman, OK: University of Oklahoma Press.
- Smalley, Eugene Virgil. History of the Northern Pacific Railroad. New York: G.P. Putnam's Sons, 1883.
- Yenne, Bill. Great Northern Empire Builder. St. Paul, Minn.: MBI Publishing, 2005.
