= Surrender at Camp Release =

Final Act of the US-Dakota War of 1862

Coordinates: 44°56′8″N 95°44′50″W

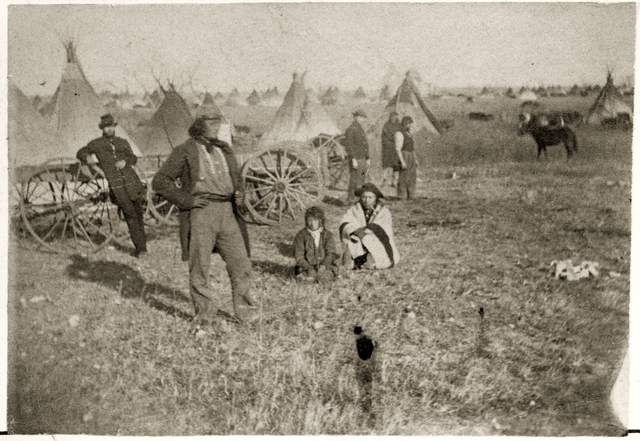
Camp Release, 1862

The Surrender at Camp Release was the final act in the Dakota War of 1862. After the Battle of Wood Lake, Colonel Henry Hastings Sibley had considered pursuing the retreating Sioux, but he realized he did not have the resources for a vigorous pursuit. Furthermore, he was aware that Chief Little Crow had been losing support and was in contact with several Mdewakanton chiefs who had signaled their opposition to further conflict.

On September 26, 1862, Colonel Sibley arrived at Camp Release, where the Dakota Peace Party handed over 269 captives who had been held hostage by the "hostile" Dakota camp, which broke up as Little Crow and his followers dispersed. In the nights that followed, a growing number of Mdewakanton warriors who had participated in battle quietly joined the "friendly" Dakotas at Camp Release; many were persuaded by Sibley's earlier promise to punish only those who had killed settlers.

Despite the "surrender," many "hostile" Dakota warriors remained at large; armed conflict eventually broke out again during the following year and it continued into 1865. Meanwhile, many members of the Dakota "peace faction" who had surrendered at Camp Release were among the Dakota who were exiled from Minnesota in 1863.

== Rescue of white and mixed-blood prisoners ==
On September 23, 1862, during the Battle of Wood Lake, Gabriel Renville, Solomon Two Stars and other "friendly" soldiers had gathered in a ravine to avoid participating in the attack on Sibley's troops. Some of the "friendly" soldiers invaded Little Crow's camp to rescue white and mixed-blood captives, using force when needed, and took them back to safety in their camp; fearing reprisal from the hostiles, they hid them in large pits they dug in the center of the lodges. Around the same time, Renville, Solomon Tukanshaciye and others pursued a war party that was fleeing westward and secured the release of additional captives.

After the Battle of Wood Lake, as pandemonium broke out in both camps, a few hostile Mdewakanton soldiers advocated attacking the friendly camp. Little Crow refused, arguing that doing so would result in more civilian deaths as well as a tribal civil war with his full- and mixed-blood relatives, and instructed his followers to pack up and flee instead. As he prepared to retreat to the northern Great Plains, he asked to see Antoine Joseph Campbell, a mixed-blood interpreter who had worked at the Redwood Agency and had accompanied him to battle and served as his secretary during his correspondence with Sibley. Campbell, returning from Sibley's camp, delivered a final message from Sibley demanding Little Crow's unconditional surrender. Fearing Little Crow's wrath, Campbell found instead that Little Crow greeted him warmly as "cousin," laughed derisively at Sibley's message, and agreed to force his soldiers to surrender the remaining 46 captives in his camp to Campbell.

In the days that followed, Sissetons and Wahpeton chiefs (such as Red Iron (Mazaduta) and Standing Buffalo), officers of the "friendly" soldiers' lodge (such as Gabriel Renville) and Mdewakanton chiefs including Wabasha and Taopi who had joined them, sent Antoine J. Campbell as a messenger to let Sibley know that the captives were safe and to seek reassurances that the Dakota who had not participated in the murders would not be harmed. In his letters, Sibley assured, "I have not come to make war upon those who are innocent but upon the guilty," and advised friendlies to remain in their camps and raise a white flag.

== Arrival of Sibley's troops at Camp Release ==
On September 25, 1862, Colonel Sibley's troops left Lone Tree Lake and marched at a slow and cautious pace about ten miles to the Hazelwood Mission, near Granite Falls, Minnesota. The next morning, September 26, Sibley and a small contingent of American soldiers entered the "friendly" camp, which became known as Camp Release, and saw "nothing but white rags, attached to the top of tepee poles."

Sibley wrote about the event, "The Indians and half-breeds assembled ... in considerable numbers, and I proceeded to give them very briefly my views of the late proceedings; my determination that the guilty parties should be pursued and overtaken, if possible, and I made a demand that all the captives should be delivered to me instantly, that I might take them to my camp."

In his memoir, Gabriel Renville recounted, "With joyous handshaking we met, and the white prisoners were taken into the soldiers' camp." Major Joseph R. Brown was finally reunited with his wife Susan Frenier Brown and their children.

The Dakota Peace Party immediately released 91 white settlers and about 150 mixed-blood captives, and within the next few days, secured the release of additional captives. The total number of captives was 107 whites and 162 mixed-bloods, for a grand total of 269.

In the nights that followed, a growing number of Mdewakantons, some of whom had been in Little Crow's camp and did not want to flee to the plains, quietly joined the families at Camp Release. Sibley allowed them to come in, requiring only that they give up their guns and ammunition. Historian Gary Clayton Anderson writes, "It was a devilish plot: he wholly intended to capture as many of these Indians as possible, believing most to be guilty of killing civilians."

On September 28, 1862, a military commission established by Colonel Sibley began to interrogate and try the Dakota men accused of participating in the war. Several weeks later, the trials were moved to the last building left standing at the Lower Sioux Agency.

== Memorial ==
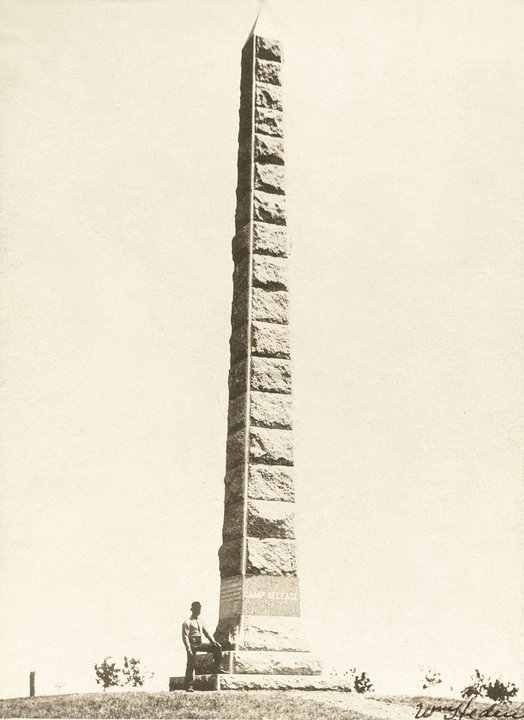
Camp Release Monument

Camp Release Township, Lac qui Parle County, Minnesota was organized in 1871, and named in commemoration of the incident. Camp Release State Monument near Montevideo, Minnesota was dedicated in 1894 as a memorial of the event.

== See also ==
- Sarah F. Wakefield, a white captive released at Camp Release
