= Big Eagle =

Native American leader – Dakota chief (c. 1827–1906)

- Waŋbdí Táŋka
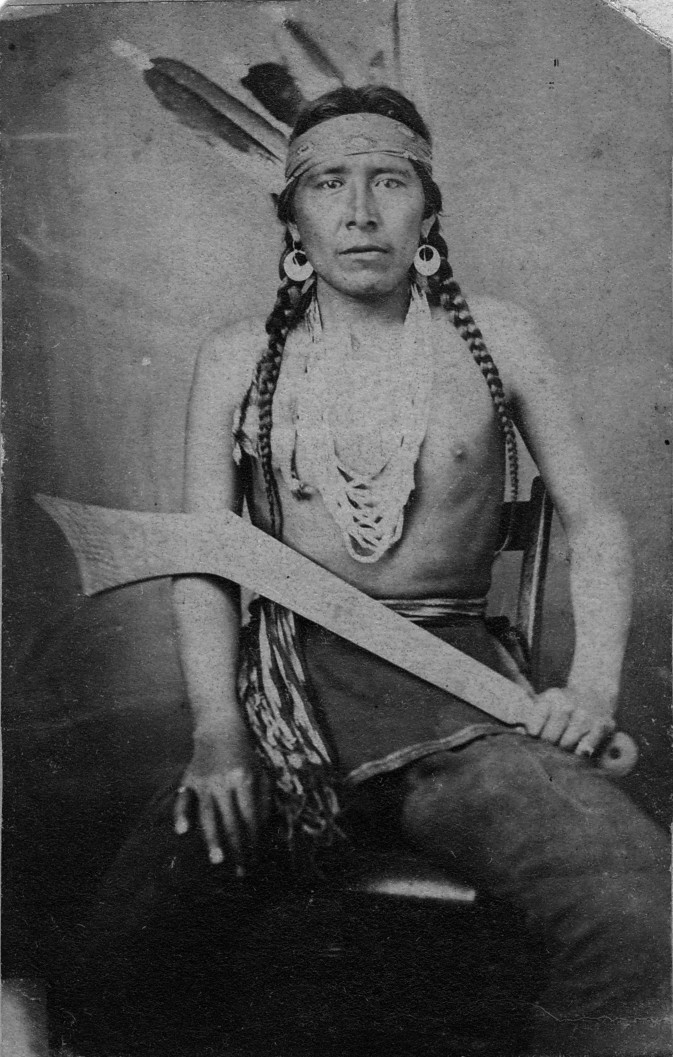
- Chief Big Eagle (1864)
- Born: 1827; Eagan, Michigan Territory
- Died: 5 January 1906 (aged 78–79); Granite Falls, Minnesota
- Other names: Jerome Big Eagle; Wambditanka; Wamditanka
- Occupation: Native American leader
- Spouse: Emma Big Eagle

Big Eagle (Dakota: Waŋbdí Táŋka, c. 1827–1906) was the chief of a band of Mdewakanton Dakota in Minnesota. He played an important role as a military leader in the Dakota War of 1862. Big Eagle surrendered soon after the Battle of Wood Lake and was sentenced to death and imprisoned, but was pardoned by President Abraham Lincoln in 1864. Big Eagle's narrative, "A Sioux Story of the War" was first published in 1894, and is one of the most widely cited first-person accounts of the 1862 war in Minnesota from a Dakota point of view.

Chief Big Eagle is featured in the "Two Men, One War" marker and the "Battle of Birch Coulee – Big Eagle" marker erected by the Minnesota Historical Society at the Birch Coulee Battlefield; he is also quoted in many of the other markers posted along the self-guided trail.

== Life before the war ==
Big Eagle was born in 1827 at Black Dog's village near Mendota, in present-day Eagan, Minnesota. He was a cousin of Little Crow's half-brother, White Spider.

He succeeded his father, Máza Ȟóta (Grey Iron) as chief of his band in 1857, and adopted the name of his grandfather, Waŋbdí Táŋka (Big Eagle). Due to the modest size of his band, he was considered a "sub-chief" but "may be termed one of the Sioux generals, since he had a band or division of his own."

As a young man, he often went on war parties against the Ojibwe and other enemies of the Mdewakanton. The six feathers he wore in his headdress symbolized the six scalps he had taken on the war path.

In 1858, he joined the Mdewakanton farmers at the Redwood Agency, also known as the Lower Sioux Agency, but became increasingly critical of the farming movement in the years leading up to the Dakota War of 1862.

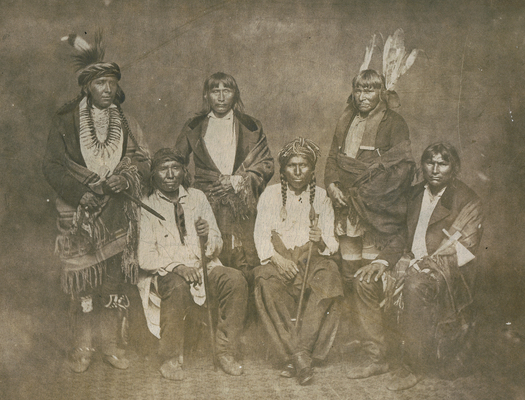
Big Eagle (far left) went to Washington, DC in 1858 as part of the Mdewakanton & Wahpkute Dakota Treaty Delegation

=== 1858 Dakota treaty delegation ===
Big Eagle went to Washington, D.C., in 1858 as part of the Mdewakanton and Wahpekute Dakota treaty delegation led by Little Crow, when he was Little Crow's head warrior (akacita). Other Mdewakanton leaders in attendance included major chiefs Little Crow, Wabasha, Shakopee II, Wakute, Mankato, Traveling Hail and Black Dog; other sub-chiefs such as Whale, Tomahawk and Iron Elk; and representatives of Little Crow's soldiers' lodge including Big Eagle's uncle Medicine Bottle I, The Thief, and the sole Wahpekute delegate, Red Legs.

During the lengthy negotiations, the Dakota leaders were pressured to sign a treaty relinquishing half of their holdings – the land north and east of the Minnesota River – to the United States, leaving the Dakota with title to a 10-by-150 mile strip of land. According to Big Eagle:

"In 1858 the ten miles of this strip belonging to the Medawakanton and Wacouta bands and lying north of the river was sold, mainly through the influence of Little Crow. That year, with some other chiefs, I went to Washington on business connected with the treaty. The selling of that strip north of the Minnesota caused great dissatisfaction among the Sioux, and Little Crow was always blamed for the part he took in the sale. It caused us all to move to the south side of the river, where there was but very little game, and many of our people, under the treaty, were induced to give up the old life and go to work like white men, which was very distasteful to many."

The delegation spent over three months in Washington, D.C., providing Big Eagle and the other Dakota leaders with time to sightsee and observe American society.

=== Contest for chief speaker of tribe ===
In the spring of 1862, Wambditanka (Big Eagle), Little Crow and Traveling Hail were candidates for chief speaker of the Mdewakanton tribe which Traveling Hail won. According to Big Eagle:

"There was a white man’s party and an Indian party. We had politics among us and there was much feeling. A new chief speaker for the tribe was to be elected. There were three candidates, Little Crow, myself and Wa-sui-hi-ya-ye-dan ('Traveling Hail'). After an exciting contest, Traveling Hail was elected. Little Crow felt sore over his defeat. Many of our tribe believed him responsible for the sale of the north ten-mile strip, and I think this was why he was defeated. I did not care much about it. Many whites think that Little Crow was the principal chief of the Dakotas at this time, but he was not. Wabasha was the principal chief, and he was of the white man’s party. So was I. So was old Shakopee, whose band was very large. Many think if old Shakopee had lived there would have been no war, for he was for the white men and had great influence. But he died that summer, and was succeeded by his son, whose real name was Ea-to-ka ('Another Language'), but when he became chief he took his father’s name, and was afterwards called 'Little Shakopee,' or 'Little Six,' for in the Sioux language 'shakopee' means six. This Shakopee was against the white men. He took part in the outbreak, murdering women and children, but I never saw him in a battle..."

Regarding the election, historian Gary Clayton Anderson writes, "The selection of a speaker, coming at a time of growing unrest, served as a weather vane; it was a test of will between traditional and improvement Indians." At the time, Little Crow was considered a traditionalist and was favored by the young men who wished to continue as hunters, while Traveling Hail was favored by the farmers among the Mdewakanton. The other candidate favored by the farmers was Big Eagle, "a relatively new leader of a moderate political mold who grew up in Black Dog's village."

== Dakota War of 1862 ==
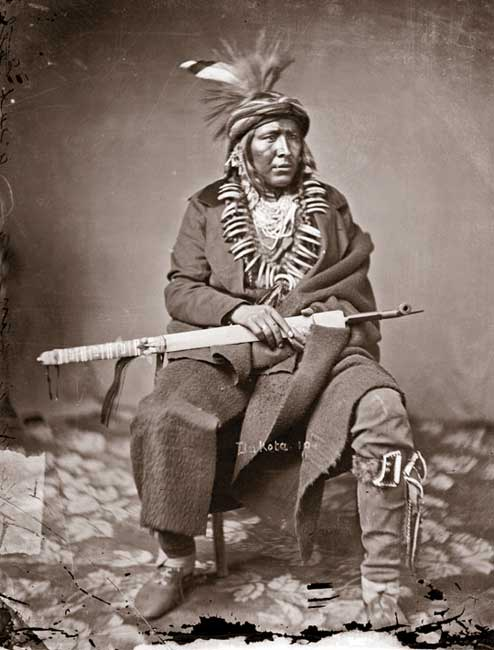
Chief Big Eagle (1858)

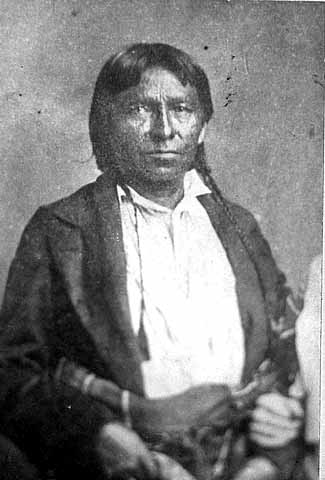
Chief Wabasha (1858)

At the outbreak of the Dakota War of 1862, Big Eagle's village was at Crow Creek, near Little Crow's village.

Shortly before the war, Big Eagle's uncle, Medicine Bottle, was killed in a tragic accident outside his home. Medicine Bottle I was described by Dr. Asa W. Daniels as "an Indian of much ability, honest, truthful, [who] bore the duties of life faithfully, and always gave good advice and worthy example to others of his people." Following his death, Big Eagle's brother Grizzly Bear took their uncle's name and became known as Medicine Bottle II (Wakanozanan).

Chief Big Eagle took part in all major battles during the Dakota War of 1862, except for the Battle of Redwood Ferry, where he arrived after the fighting had stopped. He led his band at the second battles of New Ulm and Fort Ridgely, as well as the Battles of Birch Coulee and Wood Lake.

=== Initial ambivalence ===
In his narrative, Big Eagle explained that he was initially reluctant to support the war. Having traveled to Washington, D.C. as part of the treaty delegation in 1858, he was aware that the U.S. government could not be defeated easily:

"Though I took part in the war, I was against it. I knew there was no good cause for it, and I had been to Washington and knew the power of the whites and that they would finally conquer us. We might succeed for a time, but we would be overpowered and defeated at last. I said all this and many more things to my people, but many of my own bands were against me, and some of the other chiefs put words in their mouths to say to me. When the outbreak came Little Crow told some of my band that if I refused to lead them to shoot me as a traitor who would not stand up for his nation, and then select another leader in my place."

Even after Little Crow agreed to lead the war and ordered the attack on the Redwood Agency on August 18, 1862, he refused to participate in the killing of settlers:

"Wabasha, Wacouta, myself, and others still talked for peace, but nobody would listen to us, and soon the cry was 'Kill the whites and kill all these cut-hairs who will not join us.' A council was held and war was declared... I did not have a very large band – not more than thirty or forty fighting men. Most of them were not for the war at first, but nearly all got into it at last. A great many members of the other bands were like my men; they took no part in the first movements, but afterward did. The next morning, when the force started down to attack the agency, I went along. I did not lead my band, and I took no part in the killing. I went to save the lives of two particular friends if I could. I think others went for the same reason, for nearly every Indian had a friend that he did not want killed; of course he did not care about the others' friends. The killing was nearly all done when I got there."

Upon their return, Big Eagle committed to leading his band into the war:

"When I returned to my village that day I found that many of my band had changed their minds about the war and wanted to go into it. All the other villages were the same way. I was still of the belief that it was not best, but I thought I must go with my band and my nation, and I said to my men that I would lead them into the war, and we would all act like brave Dakota and do the best we could. All my men were with me; none had gone off on raids, but we did not have guns for all at first."

=== Lives saved ===
In his narrative, Big Eagle stated that he was reluctant to claim credit for saving the lives of settlers during the massacres, because after the war, many Dakota warriors made claims that weren't true: "So many Indians have lied about their saving the lives of white people that I dislike to speak of what I did."

One settler he mentioned by name in his narrative, however, was George H. Spencer, a clerk in the trading store of William Henry Forbes. Spencer's life was spared during the August 18 massacre and he became one of four male prisoners taken captive during the war. After the war, Spencer credited Wakinyatawa (His Own Thunder) for intervening to save his life, but had no recollection of the role that Big Eagle had played:

"But I did save the life of George H. Spencer at the time of the massacre. I know that his friend, Chaska, has always had the credit of that, but Spencer would have been a dead man in spite of Chaska if it had not been for me. I asked Spencer about this once, but he said he was wounded at the time and so excited that he could not remember what I did. Once after that I kept a half-breed family from being murdered; these are all the people whose lives I claim to have saved. I was never present when the white people were willfully murdered. I saw all the dead bodies at the agency."

In 1906, Big Eagle's obituary in the Minneapolis Journal claimed that he had saved the life of the Alvin family during the siege of New Ulm: "An incident that happened during the siege of New Ulm in 1862 shows that he was friendly to the whites. Near New Ulm lived a family by the name of Alvin. Alvin and a young son were in the field stacking grain when Big Eagle came to warn them that if they did not go to New Ulm at once they would be killed. They hastily drove their ox team to the house, loaded on the family and a few articles of clothing and started for New Ulm. The hostile Indians attempted to overtake them and chased them all the way to town."

=== New Ulm and Fort Ridgely ===
Regarding the second battle at New Ulm, Big Eagle only had a small group of men from his band; he recounted that there was no commander leading the attack:

"I was not in the first fight at New Ulm nor the first attack on Fort Ridgely... I was in the second fight at New Ulm and in the second attack on Fort Ridgely. At New Ulm I had but a few of my band with me. We lost none of them. We had but few, if any, of the Indians killed; at least I did not hear of but a few. A halfbreed named George Le Blanc, who was with us, was killed. There was no one in chief command of the Indians at New Ulm. A few subchiefs, like myself, and the head soldiers led them, and the leaders agreed among themselves what was to be done. I do not think there was a chief present at the first fight. I think that attack was made by marauding Indians from several bands, every man for himself, but when we heard they were fighting we went down to help them. I think it probable that the first attack on Fort Ridgely was made in the same way; at any rate, I do not remember that there was a chief there."

On the other hand, Big Eagle described the second battle at Fort Ridgely as a "grand affair," including Little Crow and Good Thunder, who had counted 800 soldiers on the march to the attack. According to Big Eagle, the chief leaders at the battle included The Thief, who was the head soldier of Mankato's band, and Mankato himself, "a very brave man and a good leader":

"We went down determined to take the fort, for we knew it was of the greatest importance to us to have it. If we could take it we would soon have the whole Minnesota Valley. But we failed, and of course it was best that we did fail... But for the cannon I think we would have taken the fort. The soldiers fought us so bravely we thought there were more of them than there were. The cannon disturbed us greatly, but did not hurt many. We did not have many Indians killed. I think the whites put the number too large, and I think they overestimated the number killed in every battle. We seldom carried off our dead. We usually buried them in a secluded place on the battlefield when we could. We always tried to carry away the wounded. When we retreated from Ridgely I recrossed the river opposite the fort and went up on the south side. All our army but the scouts fell back up the river to our villages near Redwood Agency, and then on up to the Yellow Medicine and the mouth of the Chippewa."

George Quinn (Wakonkdayamanne) stated that prior to the battle, "Big Eagle and The Thief tried to prevent the second attack on Fort Ridgely, by saying it was no use to attack it, for it could not be taken without too great a loss."

=== Battle of Birch Coulee ===
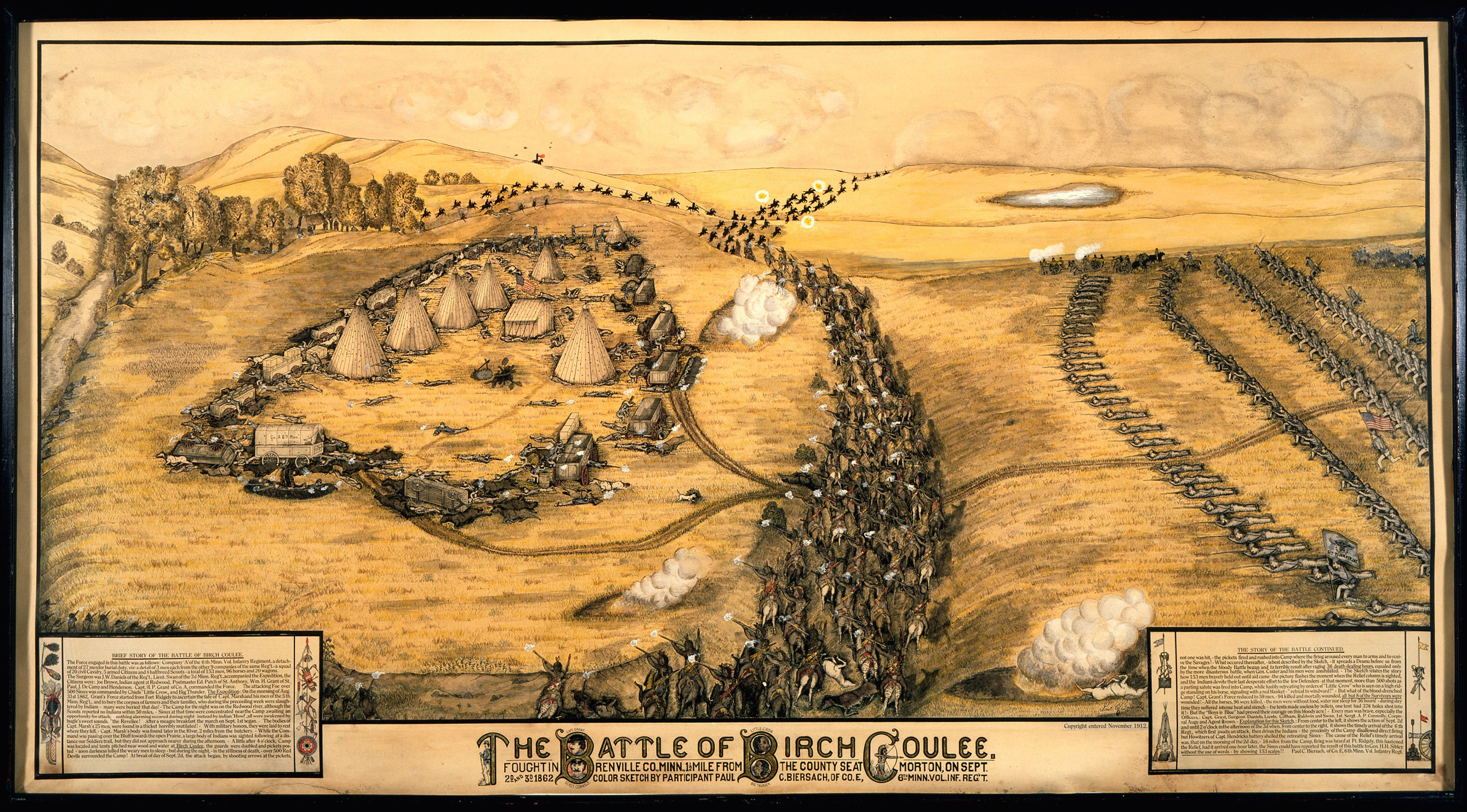
Lithograph depicting the Battle of Birch Coulee

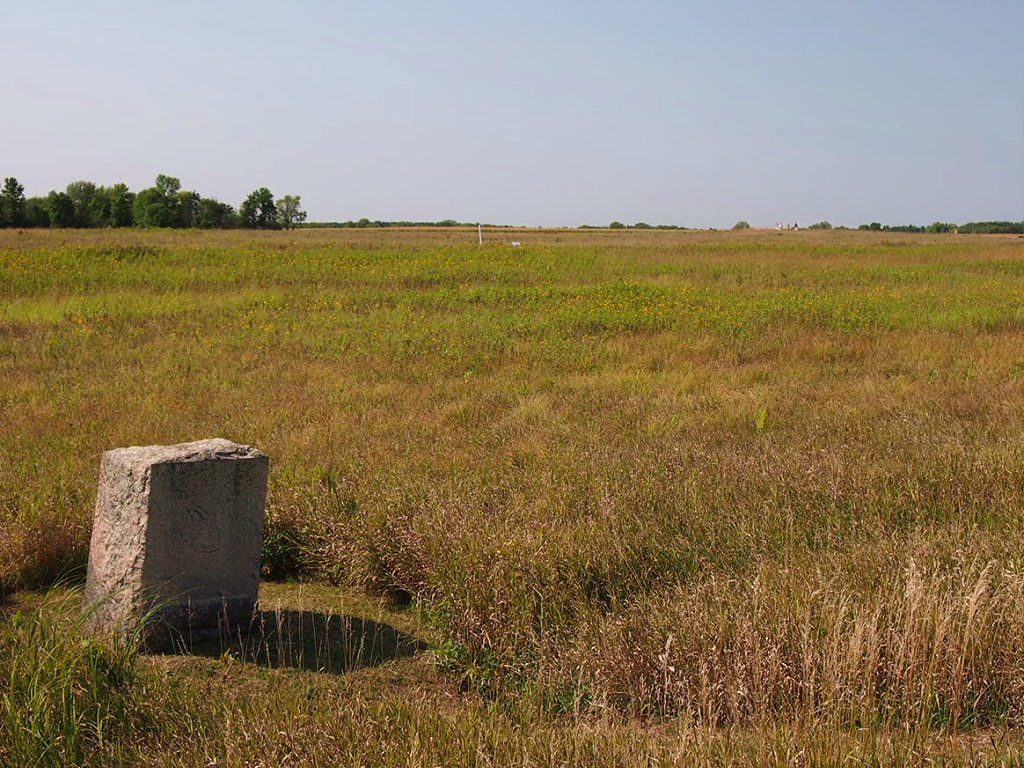
Birch Coulee battlefield

==== War council ====
In a war council held on August 31, leaders in Little Crow's camp were divided about what course to follow. After much debate, the decision was made to split into two groups. Big Eagle decided to join Gray Bird, Mankato and Red Legs in leading more than 200 warriors, accompanied by women and wagons, south along the river to collect plunder left behind in Little Crow's village and in New Ulm, which had been abandoned. Meanwhile, Little Crow (Taoyateduta) and Walker Among Stones (Tukanmani) led over 100 men east into the Big Woods.

==== Plan of attack and positions ====
Upon arriving in Little Crow's village in the afternoon on September 1, the men in advance had "looked to the north across the valley, and up on the high bluff on the north side, and out on the prairie some miles away, they saw a column of mounted men and some wagons coming out of the Beaver Creek timber on the prairie and going eastward." Four or five of their best scouts were sent to follow the movements of Captain Joseph Anderson's detachment, which was part of a burial expedition sent from Fort Ridgely; Big Eagle described the scouts tracking their movements as "creeping across the prairie like so many ants." Gray Bird's men estimated that Anderson had 75 men and predicted that would likely set up camp somewhere on the Birch Coulee, near the water. After sundown, the scouts returned to confirm the location of the campsite. Gray Bird, Mankato, Big Eagle and Red Legs then decided to attack, unaware that the mounted men had joined Captain Grant's 6th Minnesota Infantry Regiment. According to Big Eagle:

"It was concluded to surround the camp that night and attack it at daylight. We felt sure we could capture it, and that two hundred men would be enough for the undertaking. So about that number was selected. There were four bands – my own, Hushasha's (Red Legs), Gray Bird's and Mankato's. I had about thirty men. Nearly all the Indians had double-barreled shotguns, and we loaded them with buckshot and large bullets called 'traders' balls.' After dark we started, crossed the river and valley, went up the bluffs and on the prairie, and soon we saw the white tents and the wagons of the camp. We had no difficulty in surrounding the camp. The pickets were only a little way from it. I led my men up from the west through the grass and took up a position two hundred yards from the camp, behind a small knoll or elevation. Red Legs took his men into the coulee east of the camp. Mankato (Blue Earth) had some of his men in the coulee and some on the prairie. Gray Bird and his men were mostly on the prairie."

==== Ambush ====
Sometime after 4 am on the morning of September 2, 1862, one of the guards at the campsite fired at a figure crawling through the grass. The Dakota commenced their ambush immediately, killing at least a dozen men, wounding dozens more, and killing most of their horses within the first few minutes. However, the soldiers in the burial party had gone to sleep with their muskets loaded, and many were able to return fire, crouching behind the fallen horses they used as barricades, and driving back the Dakota warriors who approached the wagons. According to Big Eagle:

"Just at dawn the fight began. It continued all day and the following night until late the next morning. Both sides fought well. Owing to the white men's way of fighting they lost many men. Owing to the Indians' way of fighting they lost but few. The white men stood up and exposed themselves at first, but at last they learned to keep quiet. The Indians always took care of themselves. We had an easy time of it. We could crawl through the grass and into the coulee and get water when we wanted it, and after a few hours our women crossed the river and came up near the bluff and cooked for us, and we could go back and eat and then return to the fight. We did not lose many men. Indeed, I only saw two dead Indians, and I never heard that any more were killed."

==== Arrival of reinforcements ====
Instead of capturing the camp, the Dakota forces found themselves engaged in a lengthy siege. Big Eagle recalled: "About the middle of the afternoon our men became much dissatisfied at the slowness of the fight, and the stubbornness of the whites, and the word was passed around the lines to get ready to charge the camp. The brave Mankato wanted to charge after the first hour." However, Colonel Henry Hastings Sibley had sent a relief party – 240 men under Colonel Samuel McPhail with two six-pounder guns – causing the Dakota forces to change their plans to charge the camp. According to Big Eagle:

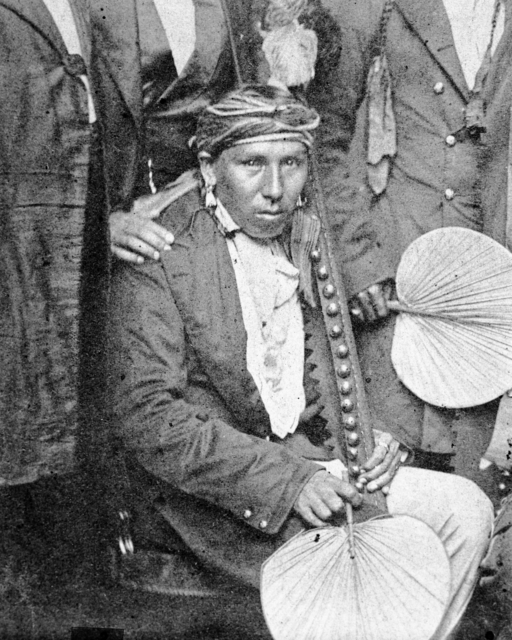
Chief Mankato (1858)

"Just as we were about to charge word came that a large number of mounted soldiers were coming up from the east toward Fort Ridgely. This stopped the charge and created some excitement. Mankato at once took some men from the Coulie and went out to meet them. He told me he did not take more than fifty, but he scattered them out and they all yelled and made such a noise that the whites must have thought there were a great many more, and they stopped on the prairie and began fighting. They had a cannon and used it, but it did no harm... Mankato flourished his men around so and all the Indians in the Coulie kept up a noise, and at last the whites began to fall back, and they retreated about two miles and began to dig breastworks. Mankato followed them and left about thirty men to watch them, and returned to the fight at the Coulie with the rest. The Indians were laughing when they came back at the way they had deceived the white men, and we were all glad that the whites had not pushed forward and driven us away... When the men of this force began to fall back the whites in the camp hallooed and made a great commotion, as if they were begging them to return and relieve them and seemed much distressed that they did not."

The Battle of Birch Coulee continued until 11 am on September 3, 1862, when Colonel Sibley himself arrived with "the entire expeditionary force" and artillery. According to Big Eagle:

"The next morning Gen. Sibley came with a very large force and drove us away from the field. We took our time about getting away... There was no pursuit. The whites fired their cannons at us as we were leaving the field, but they might as well have beaten a big drum for all the harm they did. They only made a noise. We went back across the river to our camps in the old villages, and then on up the river to the Yellow Medicine and the mouth of the Chippewa, where Little Crow joined us."

=== Battle of Wood Lake ===
Big Eagle also led his band in the Battle of Wood Lake.

=== Surrender ===
Big Eagle surrendered at Camp Release in September 1862 – a decision he came to regret. As he later explained:

"Soon after the battle I, with many others who had taken part in the war, surrendered to General Sibley. Robinson [Robertson] and the other halfbreeds assured us that if we should do this we would only be held as prisoners of war a short time, but as soon as I surrendered I was thrown into prison. Afterwards I was tried, and I served three years in the prison at Davenport and the penitentiary at Rock Island for taking part in the war. On my trial a great number of the white prisoners, women and others, were called up, but not one of them could testify that I had murdered any one or had done anything to deserve death, or else I would have been hanged. If I had known that I would be sent to the penitentiary I would not have surrendered... I did not like the way I had been treated. I surrendered in good faith, knowing that many of the whites were acquainted with me, and that I had not been a murderer, or present when a murder had been committed, and if I had killed or wounded a man it had been in fair, open fight."

== After the war ==
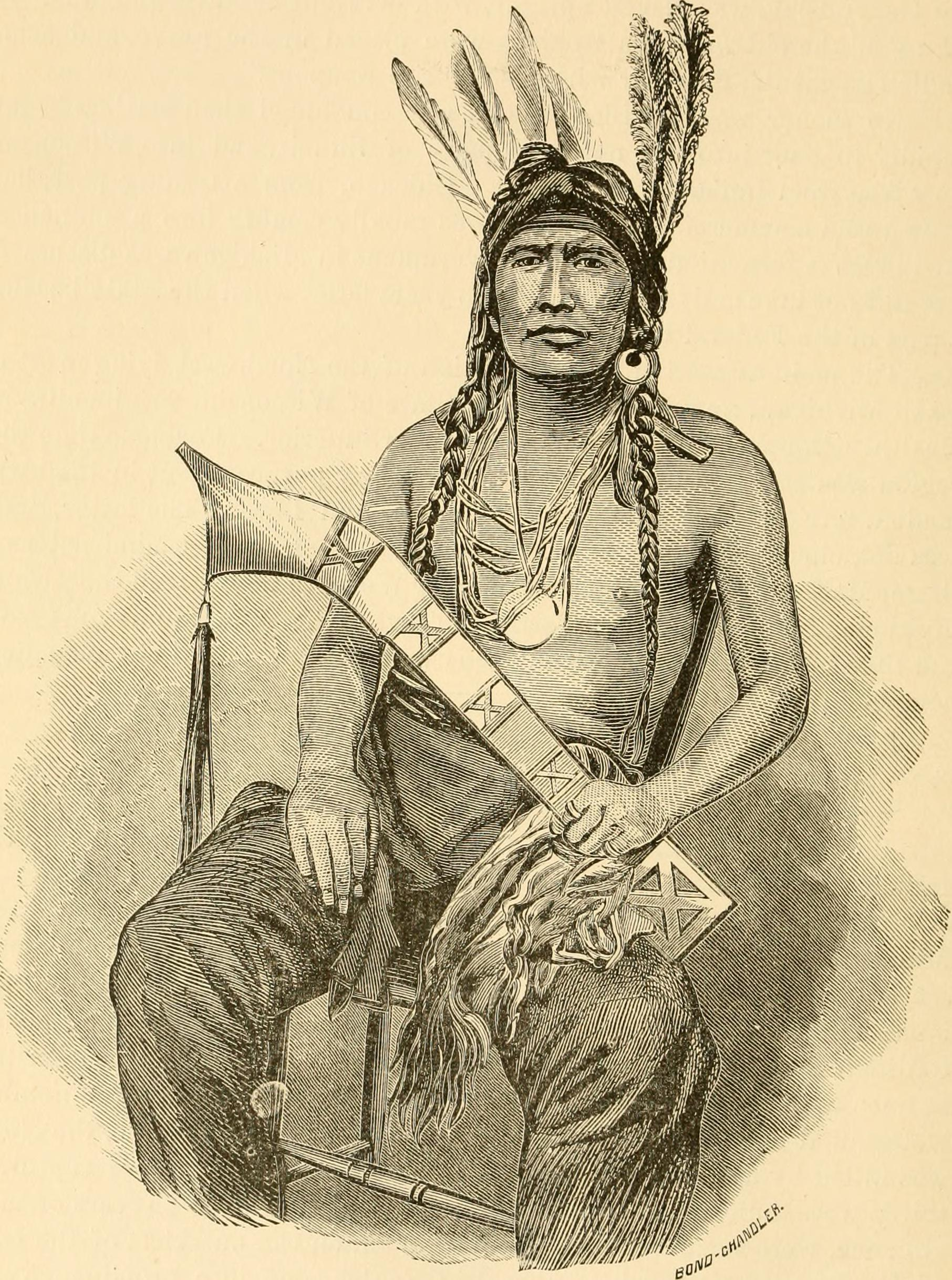
Artist's rendition of Big Eagle (1864)

=== Imprisonment and pardon ===
Big Eagle was tried by the military commission and was sentenced to death, but was given a reprieve and was sent to the prison camp in Davenport, Iowa.

President Abraham Lincoln pardoned Big Eagle in November 1864 and he was ordered released on December 3. Wambditanka's pardon had initially been approved by President Lincoln on October 26, 1864, when he was meeting with George Dow. Legal scholar Carol Chomsky writes, "Lincoln wrote, in pencil, on the back of Dow's letter of introduction, 'Let the Indian Big Eagle now confined at Davenport, Iowa be discharged at once.' When Dow presented this pardon to the commander of the camp in Davenport, he and the order were treated 'with much rudeness and contempt.'"

Big Eagle's brother, Medicine Bottle II (Wakanozanzan), was captured with Little Six (Shakopee III) in Manitoba in 1864 and executed in 1865.

==== Story behind the portrait ====
The famous portrait of Big Eagle was taken during the summer of 1864 when he was in prison at Camp Kearney (the Native American Stockade at Camp McClellen, Davenport). W. W. Hathaway, then the assistant commissary, had persuaded Big Eagle, the highest ranking Dakota in the prison, to sit for a photograph in a studio that had opened nearby.

"Everything went well until we neared the place, when Big Eagle began to remove his finery," said Hathaway. "We asked him what the trouble was and he said he would not pose unless we paid him $15."

=== Life after prison ===
After leaving prison, Big Eagle joined his band at Crow Creek Reservation and moved to the Santee Reservation in 1866. Living on a reservation subject to the control of an Indian agent did not suit him.

He left Santee in the spring of 1869 and settled with his family near Birch Coulee. He became known as Jerome Big Eagle and was baptized as "Elijah".

In June 1894, while on a visit to Flandreau, South Dakota, Big Eagle was interviewed by historian and journalist Return Ira Holcombe with the help of two interpreters, Nancy Huggan and her son-in-law, the Reverend John Eastman. The resulting narrative was published in the St. Paul Pioneer Press on July 1, 1894, and was subsequently reprinted by the Minnesota Historical Society. It was the first extensive account of the Dakota War of 1862 told from a Dakota point of view.

In his narrative, 67-year-old Big Eagle said that he had come to peace with his situation after the war:

"All feeling on my part about this has long since passed away. For years I have been a Christian, and I hope to die one. My white neighbors and friends know my character as a citizen and a man. I am at peace with every one, whites and Indians. I am getting to be an old man, but I am still able to work. I am poor, but I manage to get along."

Big Eagle spent his final years living in Granite Falls, Minnesota, where he died after two days of illness on January 5, 1906.

== "A Sioux Story of the War" ==
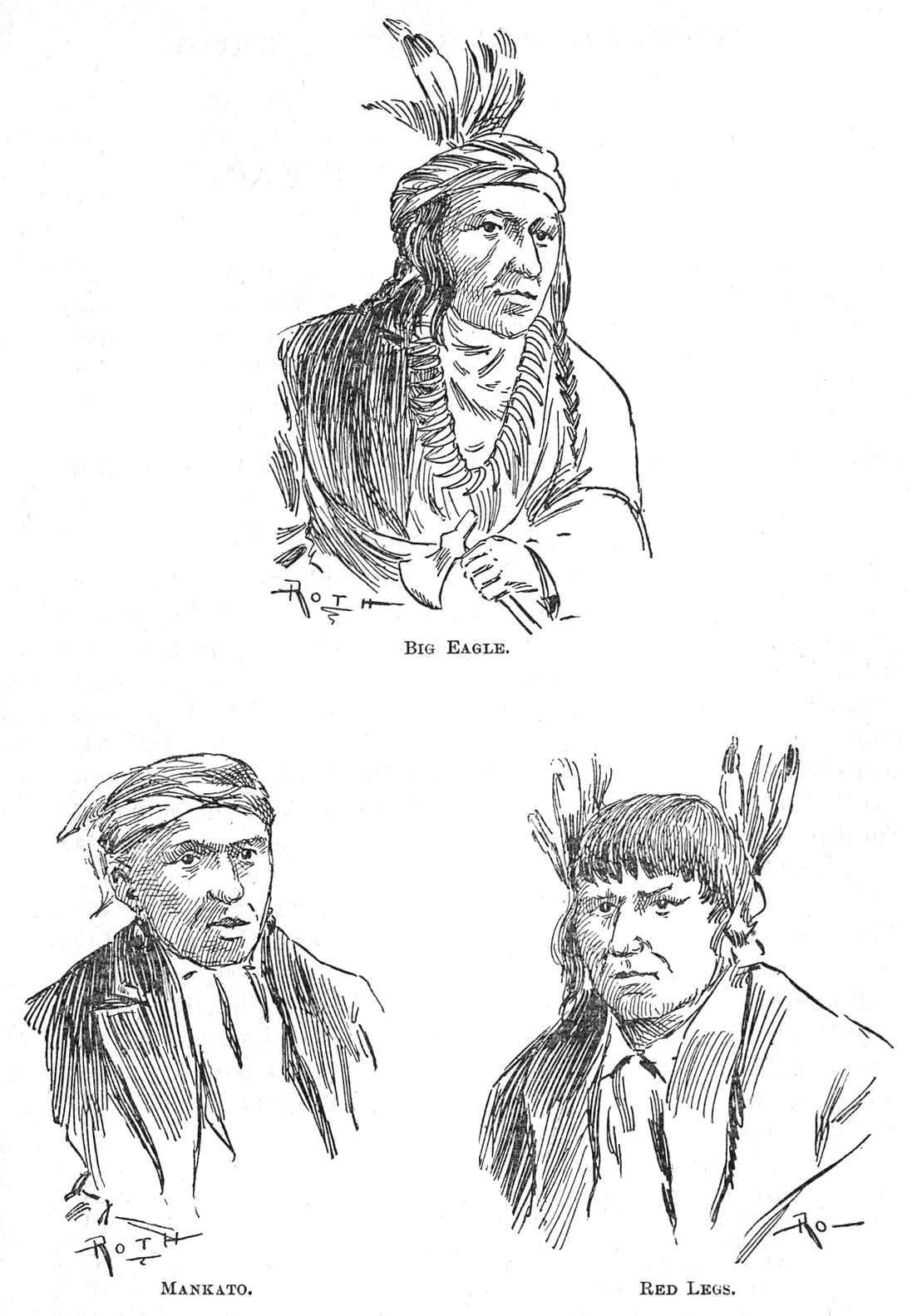
Sketches of Big Eagle, Mankato and Red Legs published alongside Big Eagle's narrative in 1894

In June 1894, Big Eagle was interviewed by historian and journalist Robert Ira Holcombe through two interpreters. The narrative, "A Sioux Story of the War: Chief Big Eagle's Story of the Sioux Outbreak of 1862," first appeared in the St. Paul Pioneer Press on July 1, 1894, and was reprinted in Collections of the Minnesota Historical Society later that year.

In his introduction, Holcombe explained the terms under which Big Eagle granted the interview:

Mr. Big Eagle was first informed that his statements were wanted solely in order that a correct knowledge of the military movements of the Indians during the war might be learned. It was suggested to him that no harm there from could come to him or any of his people; that neither the war banner nor the "bloody shirt" waved any longer in Minnesota; that it was well known that he was a prominent character in the war, but that he was now and had been for many years a quiet, industrious Christian citizen, respected by all who knew him, and he was assured that he would be correctly reported. He readily consented to tell his story, and gave full permission to use his name.

Holcombe was satisfied that Big Eagle was honest in his statements:

The old man was very frank and unreserved. He did not seem to wish to avoid or evade an answer to a single question. He is of more than ordinary intelligence, and spoke candidly, deliberately and impassively, and with the air and manner of one striving to tell “the whole truth and nothing but the truth.” He proved a mine of information, and his story contains many items of history never before published.

=== Historical significance of narrative ===
Big Eagle's narrative was the first comprehensive account of the war to be published from the point of view of a Dakota leader who had fought alongside Little Crow. In the words of historian Kenneth Carley, "In addition to being a 'first' and an 'exclusive,' the interview had significance because Big Eagle was a Sioux leader who took part in councils where decisions were made."

Return I. Holcombe himself was uniquely well-qualified to conduct the interview of Big Eagle. A Union Army veteran of the American Civil War who was also an avid reader of the Confederate Veteran, Holcombe had been employed for a year at the Minnesota Historical Society where he "arranged and examined the large collection of letters and other papers received from General Sibley, who had died two years before."

One early critic of Big Eagle's narrative was Samuel J. Brown, son of Joseph R. Brown, who wrote a letter to Holcombe on February 6, 1896, expressing skepticism about Big Eagle's version of events. However, Holcombe, who also wrote "The Great Sioux Outbreak of 1862," was himself considered "the first historian to write objectively about this war." Regarding Holcombe, historian William E. Lass writes, "His work displayed factual accuracy, critical evaluation of sources – including eyewitness accounts – and a dispassionate style free of inflammatory language."

On the continuing significance of Big Eagle's narrative of the Dakota War of 1862, historian Kenneth Carley wrote in 1962, "Regardless of Brown's estimate, or of any imperfections the narrative may have, it has been widely used – and of necessity will continue to be used – by writers interested in telling the Indian as well as the white side of the outbreak. There simply is no other major Indian account to compare with it."
