= Iowa Lake =

Lake in the state of Minnesota, United States

- Location within Minnesota Location within Iowa
- Location: Iowa and Minnesota
- Coordinates: 43°30′N 95°27.5′W
- Type: lake
- Basin countries: United States
- Surface elevation: 1,510 ft (460 m)

Iowa Lake is a lake in the U.S. states of Iowa and Minnesota.

Iowa Lake was so named from the fact it straddles the Iowa–Minnesota state line.
