= Alan Woolworth =

American anthropologist (1924–2014)

Alan R. Woolworth (August 19, 1924 – August 13, 2014) was an American archaeologist known for his career at the Minnesota Historical Society. Most of his career focused on the Indigenous peoples in Nebraska, North Dakota, South Dakota, and Minnesota.

== Early life and education ==
Alan R. Woolworth was born on August 19, 1924, in Clear Lake, South Dakota, where he was raised. At 19, he enlisted in the army. He served in the 70th Infantry Division and was stationed in France and Germany where he was wounded. He later served in Czechoslovakia. He received a Purple Heart with an oak leaf cluster and a Bronze Star.

Upon returning from Europe, he attended the University of Nebraska and the University of Minnesota to study archaeology. He earned his bachelors degree in History and Anthropology at the University of Nebraska, and his masters at the University of Minnesota.

== Career ==
Beginning in 1952, he served as the staff archeologist at the State Historical Society of North Dakota for five years. He later worked as a curator in the Dearborn Historical Museum in Michigan for three years. He then spent several decades at the Minnesota Historical Society. Throughout his time there, he was museum curator, head of the Museum and Historic Sites department, chief archaeologist, and finally a research fellow. A compiled collection of his papers can be found at the Minnesota Historical Society.

Woolworth, along with his wife, Nancy, formed the Woolworth Research Associates. He also helped start a publishing company called the Prairie Smoke Press.

== Selected works ==
- “ALAN R. WOOLWORTH: An Inventory of His Papers at the Minnesota Historical Society.” n.d. Text. Chippewa National Forest (Minn.). Accessed October 15, 2023. http://www2.mnhs.org/library/findaids/00339.xml.
- Woolworth Alan R., Henry G. Allanson, Mary H. Eastman, James Garvie, David Grey Cloud Julia Ann Laframboise, Martha Riggs Morris et al. 2003. Santee Dakota Indian Legends. Saint Paul, Minn: Prairie Smoke Press for Sisseton-Wahpeton Sioux Tribe.
- Woolworth Alan R and W. Raymond Wood. 2000. The Demery Site (39c01) Oahe Reservoir Area South Dakota. Salinas CA: Coyote Press.
- Woolworth Alan R., John L. Champe and United States Indian Claims Commission. 1974. Ethnohistorical Report on the Yankton Sioux. New York: Garland Pub.

== Personal life and death ==
Alan R. Woolworth died on August 13, 2014, shortly before his 90th birthday, in North Memorial Hospital in Minneapolis. Woolworth left behind two daughters and four grandchildren. He was known as a friend to the Sioux Community until his death.
