= List of people executed in Minnesota =

This is a list of people executed in Minnesota as both a territory and a state. Between Minnesota's first recorded execution in 1854 (which occurred while it was a territory) and the state's final recorded execution in 1906, there were at least 70 legal executions in Minnesota. All executions in Minnesota were carried out by hanging.

Notably, on December 26, 1862, Minnesota was the site of the largest mass execution in United States history when 38 men, all Dakota men involved in the Dakota War of 1862, were simultaneously executed by hanging on the same gallows in Mankato, Minnesota, after being convicted of various capital crimes including murder, being an accessory to murder, and kidnapping. However, these hangings were ordered by a military commission and thus overseen by the federal government.

Minnesota experienced a 17-year moratorium on executions between 1868 and 1885 due to the passage of a law limiting the application of the death penalty in the state. The law was passed in 1868 and repealed in 1883. Capital punishment in Minnesota was officially abolished on April 22, 1911. No executions have taken place in Minnesota since 1906.

Information is sourced from the Espy Files unless otherwise specified.

The list does not contain extrajudicial executions, murders, or lynchings.

== All executions in Minnesota, 1854–1906 ==
Name	Race	Age	Sex	Date of Execution	County	Crime(s)	Ref.
Uhazy (or Yuhagu)	Native American	-	M	December 29, 1854	Morrison	Murder	
Ann Bilansky	White	34	F	March 23, 1860	Waseca	Murder	
Henry Kriegler	White	-	M	March 1, 1861	Ramsey	Murder	
Ti hdo' ni ca	Native American	-	M	December 26, 1862	Blue Earth	Murder, accessory to murder, or kidnapping related to involvement in the Dakota War of 1862	
Hda Inyan Ka	Native American	-	M	December 26, 1862	Blue Earth	Murder, accessory to murder, or kidnapping related to involvement in the Dakota War of 1862	
Ptan Du ta	Native American	-	M	December 26, 1862	Blue Earth	Murder, accessory to murder, or kidnapping related to involvement in the Dakota War of 1862	
Mahpi'ya A i'na zin	Native American	-	M	December 26, 1862	Blue Earth	Murder, accessory to murder, or kidnapping related to involvement in the Dakota War of 1862	
Hin han'sunko yag mani	Native American	-	M	December 26, 1862	Blue Earth	Murder, accessory to murder, or kidnapping related to involvement in the Dakota War of 1862	
Maza Bo mdu	Native American	-	M	December 26, 1862	Blue Earth	Murder, accessory to murder, or kidnapping related to involvement in the Dakota War of 1862	
Wa hpe Duta	Native American	-	M	December 26, 1862	Blue Earth	Murder, accessory to murder, or kidnapping related to involvement in the Dakota War of 1862	
Wa hi' hna	Native American	-	M	December 26, 1862	Blue Earth	Murder, accessory to murder, or kidnapping related to involvement in the Dakota War of 1862	
Sna Mani	Native American	-	M	December 26, 1862	Blue Earth	Murder, accessory to murder, or kidnapping related to involvement in the Dakota War of 1862	
Oyate' A ku	Native American	-	M	December 26, 1862	Blue Earth	Murder, accessory to murder, or kidnapping related to involvement in the Dakota War of 1862	
Do wan' s'a	Native American		M	December 26, 1862	Blue Earth	Murder, accessory to murder, or kidnapping related to involvement in the Dakota War of 1862	
He pan	Native American	-	M	December 26, 1862	Blue Earth	Murder, accessory to murder, or kidnapping related to involvement in the Dakota War of 1862	
Sun'ka ska	Native American	-	M	December 26, 1862	Blue Earth	Murder, accessory to murder, or kidnapping related to involvement in the Dakota War of 1862	
Am-da-cha	Native American	-	M	December 26, 1862	Blue Earth	Murder, accessory to murder, or kidnapping related to involvement in the Dakota War of 1862	
Tunkan' I ca'hda mani	Native American	-	M	December 26, 1862	Blue Earth	Murder, accessory to murder, or kidnapping related to involvement in the Dakota War of 1862	
I te' Duta	Native American	-	M	December 26, 1862	Blue Earth	Murder, accessory to murder, or kidnapping related to involvement in the Dakota War of 1862	
He pi'da	Native American	-	M	December 26, 1862	Blue Earth	Murder, accessory to murder, or kidnapping related to involvement in the Dakota War of 1862	
Maȟpiya Akan Nažiŋ	Native American	-	M	December 26, 1862	Blue Earth	Murder, accessory to murder, or kidnapping related to involvement in the Dakota War of 1862	
Henry Milford	Native American	-	M	December 26, 1862	Blue Earth	Murder, accessory to murder, or kidnapping related to involvement in the Dakota War of 1862	
Chaska (Dakota: Wičháhpi Waštédaŋpi)	Native American	-	M	December 26, 1862	Blue Earth	Murder, accessory to murder, or kidnapping related to involvement in the Dakota War of 1862	
Baptiste Campbell	Native American	-	M	December 26, 1862	Blue Earth	Murder, accessory to murder, or kidnapping related to involvement in the Dakota War of 1862	
Tate' Kaga	Native American	-	M	December 26, 1862	Blue Earth	Murder, accessory to murder, or kidnapping related to involvement in the Dakota War of 1862	
He In'Kpa	Native American	-	M	December 26, 1862	Blue Earth	Murder, accessory to murder, or kidnapping related to involvement in the Dakota War of 1862	
Hypolite Ange	Native American	-	M	December 26, 1862	Blue Earth	Murder, accessory to murder, or kidnapping related to involvement in the Dakota War of 1862	
Na pe'sni	Native American	-	M	December 26, 1862	Blue Earth	Murder, accessory to murder, or kidnapping related to involvement in the Dakota War of 1862	
Wakan Tanka	Native American	-	M	December 26, 1862	Blue Earth	Murder, accessory to murder, or kidnapping related to involvement in the Dakota War of 1862	
Tunkan' Ko yag Ina'zin	Native American	-	M	December 26, 1862	Blue Earth	Murder, accessory to murder, or kidnapping related to involvement in the Dakota War of 1862	
Maka'ta I na'zin	Native American	-	M	December 26, 1862	Blue Earth	Murder, accessory to murder, or kidnapping related to involvement in the Dakota War of 1862	
Maza Kute' mani	Native American	-	M	December 26, 1862	Blue Earth	Murder, accessory to murder, or kidnapping related to involvement in the Dakota War of 1862	
Tate' Hdi da	Native American	-	M	December 26, 1862	Blue Earth	Murder, accessory to murder, or kidnapping related to involvement in the Dakota War of 1862	
Wasicuƞ	White	-	M	December 26, 1862	Blue Earth	Murder, accessory to murder, or kidnapping related to involvement in the Dakota War of 1862	
A i caga	Native American	-	M	December 26, 1862	Blue Earth	Murder, accessory to murder, or kidnapping related to involvement in the Dakota War of 1862	
Ho i'tan in ku	Native American	-	M	December 26, 1862	Blue Earth	Murder, accessory to murder, or kidnapping related to involvement in the Dakota War of 1862	
Ce tan' Hunka'	Native American	-	M	December 26, 1862	Blue Earth	Murder, accessory to murder, or kidnapping related to involvement in the Dakota War of 1862	
Can Ka hda	Native American	-	M	December 26, 1862	Blue Earth	Murder, accessory to murder, or kidnapping related to involvement in the Dakota War of 1862	
Hda' hin hde	Native American	-	M	December 26, 1862	Blue Earth	Murder, accessory to murder, or kidnapping related to involvement in the Dakota War of 1862	
Oyate Ta Wa	Native American	-	M	December 26, 1862	Blue Earth	Murder, accessory to murder, or kidnapping related to involvement in the Dakota War of 1862	
Mahu we hi	Native American	-	M	December 26, 1862	Blue Earth	Murder, accessory to murder, or kidnapping related to involvement in the Dakota War of 1862	
Wa Kin' yan na	Native American	-	M	December 26, 1862	Blue Earth	Murder, accessory to murder, or kidnapping related to involvement in the Dakota War of 1862	
John Campbell	Multiracial	-		May 3, 1865	Blue Earth	Murder	
Medicine Bottle	Native American	-	M	November 11, 1865	Hennepin	Murder, accessory to murder, or kidnapping related to involvement in the Dakota War of 1862	
Shakopee III	Native American	54	M	November 11, 1865	Hennepin	Murder, accessory to murder, or kidnapping related to involvement in the Dakota War of 1862	
Andreas Roesch	White	-	M	March 6, 1868	Nicollet	Murder	
John Waisenen	White	-	M	August 28, 1885	St. Louis	Murder-Robbery	
Nels Olsom Holong	White	30	M	April 13, 1888	Otter Tail	Murder-Rape	
John Lee	White	-	M	February 15, 1889	Douglas	Murder	
Timothy Barrett	White	-	M	March 22, 1889	Hennepin	Murder-Robbery	
Peter Barrett	White	18	M	March 22, 1889	Hennepin	Murder-Robbery	
Albert Bulow	White	28	M	July 19, 1889	Morrison	Murder-Robbery	
Thomas Brown	White	24	M	September 20, 1889	Clay	Murder	
William Brooker	White	-	M	June 27, 1890	Pine	Murder	
William Rose	White	-	M	January 17, 1891	Redwood	Murder	
Adelbert Goheen	White	20	M	January 23, 1891	Otter Tail	Murder	
Charles Ermisch	White	19	M	January 19, 1894	Ramsey	Murder-Robbery	
Otto Wonigkeit	White	19	M	January 19, 1894	Ramsey	Murder-Robbery	
Harry T. Hayward	White	29	M	December 11, 1895	Chisago	Murder	
John Pryde	White	-	M	July 23, 1896	Hennepin	Murder-Robbery	
George Kelly	White	32	M	March 23, 1897	Crow Wing	Murder-Robbery	
John Moshik	White	25	M	March 18, 1898	Hennepin	Murder-Robbery	
Joseph Ott	White	-	M	October 20, 1898	Yellow Medicine	Murder	
Franz Wallert	White	-	M	March 29, 1901	Sibley	Murder	
Andrew Tapper	White	35	M	February 18, 1902	Carver	Murder	
Charles Henderson	Black	-	M	March 6, 1903	St. Louis	Murder	
Ole Oleson	White	-	M	March 20, 1903	Aitkin	Murder	
William Chounard	White	-	M	August 30, 1904	St. Louis	Murder	
Claud Crawford	White	-	M	December 5, 1905	Aitkin	Murder-Robbery	
William Williams	White	28	M	February 13, 1906	Ramsey	Murder	

== See also ==
- Capital punishment in Minnesota
