= List of people executed in the United States in 1906 =

One hundred and twenty-seven people, all male, were executed in the United States in 1907, one hundred and twenty-four by hanging, and three by electrocution.

The state of Minnesota conducted its final execution this year before abolishing capital punishment in 1911, that of William Williams.

== List of people executed in the United States in 1906 ==
No.	Date of execution	Name	Age of person			Gender	Ethnicity	State	Method	Ref.
No.	Date of execution	Name	At execution	At offense	Age difference	Gender	Ethnicity	State	Method	Ref.
1	January 9, 1906	Ephraim Sherouk	24	23	1	Male	White	Connecticut	Hanging	
2	January 12, 1906	Dock Hardy	Unknown	Unknown	0	Male	Black	Georgia	Hanging	
3	January 12, 1906	Charles Long	Unknown	Unknown	0	Male	Black	New Jersey	Hanging	
4	January 13, 1906	Jenkins Burrows	Unknown	Unknown	0	Male	Black	South Carolina	Hanging	
5	January 13, 1906	Arthur Williams	19	19	0	Male	Black	South Carolina	Hanging	
6	January 19, 1906	William Van Dalsen	23	22	1	Male	White	Kentucky	Hanging	
7	January 26, 1906	Nicholas Murdaco	23	23	0	Male	White	New Jersey	Hanging	
8	February 2, 1906	William Walter Hamilton	27	25	2	Male	Black	District of Columbia	Hanging	
9	February 2, 1906	Ed Williams	Unknown	Unknown	1	Male	Black	Louisiana	Hanging	
10	February 8, 1906	Arthur Parson	Unknown	Unknown	Unknown	Male	Black	Tennessee	Hanging	
11	February 10, 1906	Jerry Rossa	Unknown	Unknown	2	Male	White	New Jersey	Hanging	
12	February 11, 1906	Milton Diltwer	44	43	1	Male	White	Missouri	Hanging	
13	February 13, 1906	William Williams	29	28	1	Male	White	Minnesota	Hanging	
14	February 15, 1906	Jacob Hauser Jr.	29	28	1	Male	White	Pennsylvania	Hanging	
15	February 15, 1906	Stephen Fellows	60	58	2	Male	White	Pennsylvania	Hanging	
16	February 16, 1906	Essie Johnson	21	20	1	Male	Black	Georgia	Hanging	
17	February 16, 1906	Robert E. Newcomb	52	52	0	Male	Black	Illinois	Hanging	
18	February 16, 1906	John Dorinzanivich Mueller	34	32	2	Male	White	Illinois	Hanging	
19	February 23, 1906	Johann Otto Hoch	51	49	2	Male	White	Illinois	Hanging	
20	February 26, 1906	John Conley	57	55	2	Male	White	New Mexico Territory	Hanging	
21	March 1, 1906	Charles Coleman	Unknown	Unknown	0	Male	Black	Louisiana	Hanging	
22	March 2, 1906	Andrew Thompson	38	Unknown	Unknown	Male	Black	South Carolina	Hanging	
23	March 2, 1906	William White	18	16	2	Male	White	Washington	Hanging	
24	March 6, 1906	Charles Brewster	42	41	1	Male	White	Pennsylvania	Hanging	
25	March 9, 1906	Jim Walker Jr.	16	15	1	Male	Black	Alabama	Hanging	
26	March 16, 1906	Richard Anderson	15	Unknown	Unknown	Male	Black	Georgia	Hanging	
27	March 16, 1906	Garth Thompkins	Unknown	Unknown	Unknown	Male	Black	Kentucky	Hanging	
28	March 17, 1906	Jim Hannah	Unknown	Unknown	1	Male	Black	Mississippi	Hanging	
29	March 22, 1906	Guisseppe Marmo	Unknown	Unknown	Unknown	Male	White	New Jersey	Hanging	
30	March 23, 1906	Curtis Jackson	16	16	0	Male	Black	Missouri	Hanging	
31	March 24, 1906	Rufus Johnson	31	31	0	Male	Black	New Jersey	Hanging	
32	March 24, 1906	George Small	Unknown	Unknown	0	Male	Black	New Jersey	Hanging	
33	March 28, 1906	Ed Chappell	Unknown	Unknown	0	Male	Black	Alabama	Hanging	
34	March 30, 1906	Isaac Winder	35	34	1	Male	Black	Maryland	Hanging	
35	March 30, 1906	Thomas J. Young	40	39	1	Male	White	Texas	Hanging	
36	April 4, 1906	James W. Ince	30	29	1	Male	White	Arkansas	Hanging	
37	April 6, 1906	Albert Haley	Unknown	Unknown	Unknown	Male	Black	Alabama	Hanging	
38	April 6, 1906	John Patton	Unknown	Unknown	Unknown	Male	Black	Alabama	Hanging	
39	April 6, 1906	George C. Easton	25	23	2	Male	White	California	Hanging	
40	April 6, 1906	Morris Cremeans	42	41	1	Male	White	Virginia	Hanging	
41	April 10, 1906	William M. Gray	32	30	2	Male	Black	California	Hanging	
42	April 13, 1906	Simon Brooks	46	45	1	Male	White	Washington	Hanging	
43	April 20, 1906	Joseph C. Smith	43	42	1	Male	Black	Iowa	Hanging	
44	April 20, 1906	Lu Sing	Unknown	Unknown	1	Male	Asian	Montana	Hanging	
45	April 24, 1906	Frank Johnson	Unknown	Unknown	0	Male	White	Hawaii Territory	Hanging	
46	May 11, 1906	William Young	Unknown	Unknown	2	Male	Black	Louisiana	Hanging	
47	May 18, 1906	George Broughton	30	29	1	Male	Black	Georgia	Hanging	
48	May 18, 1906	John Graham	28	27	1	Male	Black	Georgia	Hanging	
49	May 18, 1906	Huss Grant	Unknown	Unknown	1	Male	Black	Georgia	Hanging	
50	May 18, 1906	Miles Fuller	66	64	2	Male	White	Montana	Hanging	
51	May 18, 1906	Robert Booker	32	32	0	Male	Black	Virginia	Hanging	
52	May 23, 1906	Yong Bak Kang	Unknown	Unknown	1	Male	Asian	Hawaii Territory	Hanging	
53	May 23, 1906	Miung Ok Shim	Unknown	Unknown	1	Male	Asian	Hawaii Territory	Hanging	
54	May 23, 1906	Miung Sook Woo	Unknown	Unknown	1	Male	Asian	Hawaii Territory	Hanging	
55	May 25, 1906	David Arguello	37	34	3	Male	Hispanic	New Mexico Territory	Hanging	
56	May 25, 1906	John Medlock	Unknown	Unknown	5	Male	Black	New Mexico Territory	Hanging	
57	June 8, 1906	Gabriel Battaile	16	Unknown	Unknown	Male	Black	Virginia	Hanging	
58	June 8, 1906	Alexander Ackerson Armstrong	55	52	3	Male	White	Washington	Hanging	
59	June 12, 1906	Charles Lewis Tucker	25	22	3	Male	White	Massachusetts	Electrocution	
60	June 22, 1906	Richard C. Ivins	24	24	0	Male	White	Illinois	Hanging	
61	June 26, 1906	Albert Simmons	19	19	0	Male	Black	Florida	Hanging	
62	June 28, 1906	Lorenzo Colon	Unknown	Unknown	1	Male	Hispanic	Hawaii Territory	Hanging	
63	June 28, 1906	Mr. Okamoto	Unknown	Unknown	1	Male	Asian	Hawaii Territory	Hanging	
64	June 28, 1906	Edward W. Brown	Unknown	Unknown	2	Male	Black	New Jersey	Hanging	
65	June 28, 1906	John Bodnar	19	18	1	Male	White	Pennsylvania	Hanging	
66	June 28, 1906	Ben Hubbard	Unknown	Unknown	Unknown	Male	Black	Virginia	Hanging	
67	June 29, 1906	Robert Richardson	Unknown	Unknown	2	Male	Black	Alabama	Hanging	
68	June 29, 1906	Jack Wilkerson	Unknown	Unknown	Unknown	Male	White	Texas	Hanging	
69	July 6, 1906	James Pearsall	17	16	1	Male	Black	Kentucky	Hanging	
70	July 6, 1906	Henry Scott	25	24	1	Male	Black	Federal government	Hanging	
71	July 9, 1906	John Schidlofski	29	28	1	Male	White	Massachusetts	Electrocution	
72	July 12, 1906	Giovanni Mallina	Unknown	Unknown	1	Male	White	Pennsylvania	Hanging	
73	July 12, 1906	Rufus Martin	27	25	2	Male	Black	Texas	Hanging	
74	July 13, 1906	Andrew L. Davenport	31	31	0	Male	Black	Virginia	Hanging	
75	July 13, 1906	Thomas Early Jones	24	24	0	Male	Black	Virginia	Hanging	
76	July 13, 1906	Charles A. Woodruff	29	28	1	Male	Black	Virginia	Hanging	
77	July 18, 1906	Joe Anderson	Unknown	Unknown	2	Male	Black	Mississippi	Hanging	
78	July 18, 1906	Lee Fletcher	Unknown	Unknown	2	Male	Black	Mississippi	Hanging	
79	July 20, 1906	Jack Bear	Unknown	Unknown	Unknown	Male	Black	Arkansas	Hanging	
80	July 20, 1906	Robert Johnson	Unknown	Unknown	2	Male	Black	Texas	Hanging	
81	July 26, 1906	William Lee	17	17	0	Male	Black	Maryland	Hanging	
82	July 27, 1906	Cornelius Johnson	19	18	1	Male	Black	Kentucky	Hanging	
83	July 27, 1906	Robert Poindexter	Unknown	Unknown	1	Male	Black	Louisiana	Hanging	
84	July 31, 1906	Allen Mathis	16	16	0	Male	Black	Kentucky	Hanging	
85	August 3, 1906	William Marcus	41	41	0	Male	White	South Carolina	Hanging	
86	August 3, 1906	William Wilshire	22	Unknown	Unknown	Male	White	Virginia	Hanging	
87	August 8, 1906	John Mitchell	Unknown	Unknown	1	Male	Black	Tennessee	Hanging	
88	August 9, 1906	William James Trebilcox	40	39	1	Male	White	California	Hanging	
89	August 10, 1906	Earle Fletcher	23	23	0	Male	Black	Alabama	Hanging	
90	August 10, 1906	William Henry Hicks Bond	35	33	2	Male	White	Idaho	Hanging	
91	August 10, 1906	Samuel Monich	Unknown	Unknown	0	Male	White	New Jersey	Hanging	
92	August 17, 1906	Joseph Johnston	Unknown	Unknown	2	Male	Black	Kentucky	Hanging	
93	August 31, 1906	Lee Kingston	Unknown	Unknown	Unknown	Male	Black	Mississippi	Hanging	
94	August 31, 1906	Henry Bailey	Unknown	Unknown	0	Male	Black	North Carolina	Hanging	
95	September 4, 1906	Robert Cotton	46	45	1	Male	Black	Federal government	Hanging	
96	September 6, 1906	Cornelius Combs	Unknown	Unknown	1	Male	Black	Pennsylvania	Hanging	
97	September 6, 1906	Ricardo Forte	36	35	1	Male	White	Pennsylvania	Hanging	
98	September 6, 1906	John Williams	30	29	1	Male	Black	Pennsylvania	Hanging	
99	September 7, 1906	Harry Lee Brown	18	16	2	Male	White	California	Hanging	
100	September 7, 1906	Jonas Hicks	Unknown	Unknown	0	Male	Black	Georgia	Hanging	
101	September 7, 1906	Jeff Hillhouse	Unknown	Unknown	0	Male	Black	Georgia	Hanging	
102	September 10, 1906	Bob Moore	40	40	0	Male	Black	Georgia	Hanging	
103	September 11, 1906	Joseph Gibson	Unknown	Unknown	2	Male	Black	Pennsylvania	Hanging	
104	September 18, 1906	John C. Barnes	Unknown	Unknown	0	Male	White	Oregon	Hanging	
105	September 21, 1906	Butler Styles	33	33	0	Male	Black	Ohio	Electrocution	
106	September 27, 1906	Adolph Julius Weber	21	20	1	Male	White	California	Hanging	
107	October 12, 1906	Daniel Francis	40	39	1	Male	Black	Illinois	Hanging	
108	October 19, 1906	Commander J. Johnson	30	28	2	Male	White	South Carolina	Hanging	
109	October 26, 1906	Isaac Johnson	24	24	0	Male	Black	South Carolina	Hanging	
110	November 2, 1906	William Bennett	Unknown	Unknown	0	Male	Black	South Carolina	Hanging	
111	November 16, 1906	Charles Edward Grant	21	20	1	Male	Black	District of Columbia	Hanging	
112	November 16, 1906	Sims Devereaux	Unknown	Unknown	Unknown	Male	Black	Georgia	Hanging	
113	November 21, 1906	Dick Garrett	Unknown	Unknown	0	Male	Black	Texas	Hanging	
114	November 23, 1906	Thomas Stout Jr.	24	23	1	Male	Black	Kentucky	Hanging	
115	November 30, 1906	Fred A. Shepherd	23	23	0	Male	White	Oregon	Hanging	
116	November 30, 1906	Henry Brown	33	32	1	Male	Black	Texas	Hanging	
117	December 4, 1906	Alf Moore	Unknown	Unknown	1	Male	Black	Georgia	Hanging	
118	December 4, 1906	Joseph Goodson Rawlins	41	39	2	Male	White	Georgia	Hanging	
119	December 7, 1906	Thomas O. Brady	55	Unknown	Unknown	Male	White	Louisiana	Hanging	
120	December 7, 1906	Joe Ibapah	24	23	1	Male	Native American	Nevada	Hanging	
121	December 7, 1906	Johnny Indian	29	28	1	Male	Native American	Nevada	Hanging	
122	December 20, 1906	Benjamin Williams	Unknown	Unknown	1	Male	Black	North Carolina	Hanging	
123	December 20, 1906	Andrew Upton	34	33	1	Male	Black	Tennessee	Hanging	
124	December 20, 1906	Will Upton	Unknown	Unknown	1	Male	Black	Tennessee	Hanging	
125	December 21, 1906	Joseph William "Joda" Hamilton	21	20	1	Male	White	Missouri	Hanging	
126	December 21, 1906	Henry Hose	32	32	0	Male	White	Oregon	Hanging	
127	December 29, 1906	Will Perkins	Unknown	Unknown	0	Male	Black	Georgia	Hanging	

== Demographics ==
Gender
Male	127	100%
Female	0	0%
Ethnicity
Black	75	59%
White	43	34%
Asian	5	4%
Hispanic	2	2%
Native American	2	2%
State
Georgia	13	10%
Pennsylvania	9	7%
New Jersey	8	6%
Virginia	8	6%
Kentucky	7	6%
South Carolina	7	6%
Alabama	6	5%
Hawaii Territory	6	5%
Texas	6	5%
California	5	4%
Illinois	5	4%
Louisiana	5	4%
Mississippi	4	3%
Tennessee	4	3%
Missouri	3	2%
New Mexico Territory	3	2%
Oregon	3	2%
Washington	3	2%
Arkansas	2	2%
Connecticut	2	2%
Federal government	2	2%
Maryland	2	2%
Massachusetts	2	2%
Montana	2	2%
Nevada	2	2%
North Carolina	2	2%
Connecticut	1	1%
Florida	1	1%
Idaho	1	1%
Iowa	1	1%
Minnesota	1	1%
Ohio	1	1%
Method
Hanging	124	98%
Electrocution	3	2%
Month
January	7	6%
February	13	10%
March	15	12%
April	10	8%
May	11	9%
June	12	9%
July	16	13%
August	10	8%
September	12	9%
October	3	2%
November	7	6%
December	11	9%
Age
Unknown	51	40%
10–19	13	10%
20–29	26	20%
30–39	18	14%
40–49	12	9%
50–59	5	4%
60–69	2	2%
Total	127	100%

== Executions in recent years ==
Number of executions
1907	119
1906	127
1905	156
Total	402

Preceded by 1905	List of people executed in the United States in 1906	Succeeded by 1907
