= Harry Hayward =

Harry Hayward may refer to:

- Ferd Hayward (Harry Ferdinand Hayward, 1911–1988), Canadian short and long-distance walker
- Harry T. Hayward (died 1895), American criminal from Minneapolis, Minnesota
