= List of people executed in the United States in 1907 =

One hundred and nineteen people, all male, were executed in the United States in 1907, one hundred and one by hanging, and eighteen by electrocution.

== List of people executed in the United States in 1907 ==
No.	Date of execution	Name	Age of person			Gender	Ethnicity	State	Method	Ref.
No.	Date of execution	Name	At execution	At offense	Age difference	Gender	Ethnicity	State	Method	Ref.
1	January 3, 1907	William Harvey	Unknown	Unknown	1	Male	Black	Mississippi	Hanging	
2	January 4, 1907	Alberto Vargas	18	18	0	Male	Hispanic	Texas	Hanging	
3	January 10, 1907	William E. Church	25	22	3	Male	White	Missouri	Hanging	
4	January 10, 1907	John Thomas	26	Unknown	Unknown	Male	Black	Tennessee	Hanging	
5	January 11, 1907	William H. Archer	21	21	0	Male	Black	Delaware	Hanging	
6	January 11, 1907	Carlos Sais	Unknown	Unknown	Unknown	Male	Hispanic	New Mexico Territory	Hanging	
7	January 12, 1907	John George McGarvey	25	25	0	Male	White	Colorado	Hanging	
8	January 17, 1907	Elmer Dempster	18	18	0	Male	Black	Pennsylvania	Hanging	
9	January 18, 1907	James Ward	Unknown	Unknown	Unknown	Male	Black	Virginia	Hanging	
10	January 19, 1907	Clement C. Leigh	35	34	1	Male	White	Arizona Territory	Hanging	
11	January 25, 1907	Lewis Jones	30	Unknown	Unknown	Male	Black	Delaware	Hanging	
12	February 8, 1907	George Williams	28	28	0	Male	Black	Indiana	Hanging	
13	February 8, 1907	Frank Bohannon	30	Unknown	Unknown	Male	Black	North Carolina	Hanging	
14	February 8, 1907	John Henry Hodges	48	47	1	Male	White	North Carolina	Hanging	
15	February 8, 1907	Freeman Jones	Unknown	Unknown	1	Male	Black	North Carolina	Hanging	
16	February 14, 1907	A.B. Washington	Unknown	Unknown	Unknown	Male	Black	Texas	Hanging	
17	February 15, 1907	Jesse James Fitzgerald	Unknown	Unknown	1	Male	Black	Kentucky	Hanging	
18	February 15, 1907	Wiley Robertson Fletcher	67	65	2	Male	White	Kentucky	Hanging	
19	February 15, 1907	Ben Huffaker	Unknown	Unknown	Unknown	Male	Black	Kentucky	Hanging	
20	February 15, 1907	Guy H. Lyon	25	24	1	Male	White	Kentucky	Hanging	
21	February 15, 1907	Frank Castor	28	26	2	Male	White	Ohio	Electrocution	
22	February 15, 1907	Massie Hill	Unknown	Unknown	Unknown	Male	Black	Virginia	Hanging	
23	February 15, 1907	William Ruffin	Unknown	Unknown	Unknown	Male	Black	Virginia	Hanging	
24	February 25, 1907	George Henry Granger	21	19	2	Male	White	New York	Electrocution	
25	February 26, 1907	Samuel H. Anthony	51	48	3	Male	Black	Pennsylvania	Hanging	
26	February 26, 1907	Francis Godino	19	18	1	Male	White	Pennsylvania	Hanging	
27	March 1, 1907	John C. Bullard	41	40	1	Male	White	Georgia	Hanging	
28	March 4, 1907	Frank Furlong	21	18	3	Male	White	New York	Electrocution	
29	March 8, 1907	Arthur Davis	20	19	1	Male	Black	Virginia	Hanging	
30	March 15, 1907	Andrew Thomas	26	25	1	Male	White	Alabama	Hanging	
31	March 22, 1907	Peter Good	25	24	1	Male	White	Virginia	Hanging	
32	March 22, 1907	Fred Miller	25	24	1	Male	White	Washington	Hanging	
33	March 28, 1907	Charles Coleman	Unknown	Unknown	Unknown	Male	Black	Mississippi	Hanging	
34	March 29, 1907	Leon Soeder	38	34	4	Male	White	California	Hanging	
35	March 29, 1907	Thomas Harris	29	28	1	Male	White	South Carolina	Hanging	
36	April 2, 1907	Felix Powell	35	34	1	Male	Black	Texas	Hanging	
37	April 12, 1907	Joe Evans	Unknown	Unknown	Unknown	Male	Black	South Carolina	Hanging	
38	April 15, 1907	Tom Walker	Unknown	Unknown	0	Male	Black	North Carolina	Hanging	
39	April 16, 1907	Henry G. Bailey	40	39	1	Male	White	Connecticut	Hanging	
40	April 16, 1907	Edward Harold Sexton	36	32	4	Male	White	New York	Electrocution	
41	April 19, 1907	Oliver Crook Haugh	36	34	2	Male	White	Ohio	Electrocution	
42	April 23, 1907	William Burge	23	21	2	Male	Black	District of Columbia	Hanging	
43	April 25, 1907	Robert Watts	25	22	3	Male	White	Alabama	Hanging	
44	April 26, 1907	John Armstrong	Unknown	Unknown	Unknown	Male	Black	Texas	Hanging	
45	April 30, 1907	Joseph Boccia	30	29	1	Male	White	Pennsylvania	Hanging	
46	May 3, 1907	John Shelton	Unknown	Unknown	1	Male	Black	South Carolina	Hanging	
47	May 10, 1907	Alexander Herman	26	Unknown	Unknown	Male	White	Connecticut	Hanging	
48	May 10, 1907	Frisbie Gibbs	40	39	1	Male	Black	Maryland	Hanging	
49	May 21, 1907	Carlo Giardi	37	34	3	Male	White	New York	Electrocution	
50	May 24, 1907	Charles William Baird	39	38	1	Male	White	Tennessee	Hanging	
51	May 29, 1907	Buck High	15	Unknown	Unknown	Male	Black	Georgia	Hanging	
52	June 7, 1907	James King	19	Unknown	Unknown	Male	Black	Virginia	Hanging	
53	June 14, 1907	Frank Willard	43	41	2	Male	Native American	California	Hanging	
54	June 14, 1907	Will Johnson	Unknown	Unknown	1	Male	Black	Georgia	Hanging	
55	June 14, 1907	John Hardy	Unknown	Unknown	1	Male	Black	Virginia	Hanging	
56	June 15, 1907	Alfred Sargent	Unknown	Unknown	1	Male	Black	Florida	Hanging	
57	June 21, 1907	Willis McClelland	Unknown	Unknown	Unknown	Male	Black	Alabama	Hanging	
58	June 21, 1907	George William Bundrick	42	37	5	Male	White	Georgia	Hanging	
59	June 21, 1907	John Mitchell	Unknown	Unknown	Unknown	Male	Black	Georgia	Hanging	
60	June 24, 1907	John J. Johnson	39	37	2	Male	White	New York	Electrocution	
61	June 27, 1907	John King	21	19	2	Male	Black	Missouri	Hanging	
62	June 27, 1907	Edward Raymond	Unknown	Unknown	2	Male	White	Missouri	Hanging	
63	June 27, 1907	George Ryan	Unknown	Unknown	2	Male	White	Missouri	Hanging	
64	June 27, 1907	Harry Vaughan	Unknown	Unknown	2	Male	White	Missouri	Hanging	
65	June 28, 1907	James W. Cornelius	36	35	1	Male	White	Ohio	Electrocution	
66	June 28, 1907	Holiver Megorden	57	55	2	Male	White	Oregon	Hanging	
67	July 12, 1907	William Baldwin	Unknown	Unknown	0	Male	Black	Arizona Territory	Hanging	
68	July 12, 1907	Elius Jean Le Blanc	27	25	2	Male	White	Louisiana	Hanging	
69	July 19, 1907	George Steward	22	22	0	Male	Black	Louisiana	Hanging	
70	July 19, 1907	Henry White	25	24	1	Male	Black	Ohio	Electrocution	
71	July 23, 1907	Dowling Green	28	27	1	Male	Black	Pennsylvania	Hanging	
72	July 25, 1907	Charles Johnson	28	25	3	Male	White	Pennsylvania	Hanging	
73	July 25, 1907	Wilbur M. Minney	26	24	2	Male	Black	Pennsylvania	Hanging	
74	July 26, 1907	Calvin Coleman	Unknown	Unknown	2	Male	Black	Alabama	Hanging	
75	July 29, 1907	William Nelson	43	41	2	Male	Black	New York	Electrocution	
76	July 31, 1907	Charles Bonier	75	71	4	Male	White	New York	Electrocution	
77	August 8, 1907	Giovanni Graziano	32	31	1	Male	White	Pennsylvania	Hanging	
78	August 8, 1907	Georgio Quagenti	28	27	1	Male	White	Pennsylvania	Hanging	
79	August 9, 1907	Harrison Alexander	17	17	0	Male	Black	Kentucky	Hanging	
80	August 9, 1907	Lazar Mehojevich	48	Unknown	Unknown	Male	White	Louisiana	Hanging	
81	August 16, 1907	Will Nix	Unknown	Unknown	1	Male	Black	Georgia	Hanging	
82	August 20, 1907	James Rucker	Unknown	Unknown	1	Male	Black	North Carolina	Hanging	
83	August 22, 1907	Will Banks	47	Unknown	Unknown	Male	Black	North Carolina	Hanging	
84	August 22, 1907	Frank Allen	Unknown	Unknown	Unknown	Male	Black	Virginia	Hanging	
85	August 27, 1907	Carmene Renzo	45	43	2	Male	White	Pennsylvania	Hanging	
86	September 5, 1907	William McIntosh	Unknown	Unknown	0	Male	Black	Virginia	Hanging	
87	September 24, 1907	Dan Samuels	Unknown	Unknown	0	Male	Black	Mississippi	Hanging	
88	September 27, 1907	Kett P. Holt	Unknown	Unknown	1	Male	Black	Florida	Hanging	
89	September 27, 1907	Silas Connor	Unknown	Unknown	Unknown	Male	Black	Mississippi	Hanging	
90	October 3, 1907	Stefano Carlui	26	24	2	Male	White	Pennsylvania	Hanging	
91	October 3, 1907	Giuseppe Celione	26	25	1	Male	White	Pennsylvania	Hanging	
92	October 3, 1907	Antonio Delero	26	25	1	Male	White	Pennsylvania	Hanging	
93	October 3, 1907	Silverio Rodelli	34	33	1	Male	White	Pennsylvania	Hanging	
94	October 11, 1907	Lewis Young	17	17	0	Male	Black	Louisiana	Hanging	
95	October 18, 1907	William Harris	22	Unknown	Unknown	Male	Black	Virginia	Hanging	
96	October 18, 1907	George Albert Peters	34	33	1	Male	White	Virginia	Hanging	
97	October 25, 1907	Albert Davis	41	40	1	Male	Black	Ohio	Electrocution	
98	October 31, 1907	Moses Walds	23	23	0	Male	Black	Tennessee	Hanging	
99	November 1, 1907	Royal Albert Fowler	27	25	2	Male	White	Ohio	Electrocution	
100	November 7, 1907	A.J. Grill	30	28	2	Male	White	California	Hanging	
101	November 7, 1907	Dock Bailey	Unknown	Unknown	0	Male	Black	Texas	Hanging	
102	November 15, 1907	Doss Taylor	Unknown	Unknown	0	Male	Black	Alabama	Hanging	
103	November 18, 1907	John Wenzel	33	32	1	Male	White	New York	Electrocution	
104	November 22, 1907	John Taylor	18	Unknown	Unknown	Male	Black	Virginia	Hanging	
105	November 26, 1907	Beulah McGhee	Unknown	Unknown	0	Male	Black	Tennessee	Hanging	
106	November 29, 1907	John Gillison	32	Unknown	Unknown	Male	Black	Virginia	Hanging	
107	December 6, 1907	Morris Buck	28	26	2	Male	White	California	Hanging	
108	December 11, 1907	Saverio DiGiovanni	34	34	0	Male	White	New Jersey	Electrocution	
109	December 12, 1907	Jacob Stehman	47	46	1	Male	White	Pennsylvania	Hanging	
110	December 13, 1907	Joe Brown	Unknown	Unknown	0	Male	Black	Florida	Hanging	
111	December 13, 1907	Matthew Howell	26	26	0	Male	Black	Georgia	Hanging	
112	December 13, 1907	Richard Walton	36	36	0	Male	Black	Illinois	Hanging	
113	December 13, 1907	Harrison Clark	32	32	0	Male	Black	Nebraska	Hanging	
114	December 13, 1907	Noah Fulton	19	19	0	Male	White	Virginia	Hanging	
115	December 13, 1907	Thomas Johnson	Unknown	Unknown	0	Male	Black	Virginia	Hanging	
116	December 17, 1907	Stephen Dorsey	26	26	0	Male	Black	New Jersey	Electrocution	
117	December 17, 1907	Charles Gibson	31	31	0	Male	Black	New Jersey	Electrocution	
118	December 20, 1907	Edward Clifford	24	23	1	Male	White	Illinois	Hanging	
119	December 20, 1907	Frank A. Earl	28	28	0	Male	White	Ohio	Electrocution	

== Demographics ==
Gender
Male	119	100%
Female	0	0%
Ethnicity
Black	64	54%
White	52	44%
Hispanic	2	2%
Native American	1	1%
State
Pennsylvania	15	13%
Virginia	15	13%
New York	8	7%
Georgia	7	6%
Ohio	7	6%
North Carolina	6	5%
Alabama	5	4%
Kentucky	5	4%
Missouri	5	4%
Texas	5	4%
California	4	3%
Louisiana	4	3%
Mississippi	4	3%
Tennessee	4	3%
Florida	3	3%
New Jersey	3	3%
South Carolina	3	3%
Arizona Territory	2	2%
Connecticut	2	2%
Delaware	2	2%
Illinois	2	2%
Colorado	1	1%
District of Columbia	1	1%
Indiana	1	1%
Maryland	1	1%
Nebraska	1	1%
New Mexico Territory	1	1%
Oregon	1	1%
Washington	1	1%
Method
Hanging	101	85%
Electrocution	18	15%
Month
January	11	9%
February	15	13%
March	9	8%
April	10	8%
May	6	5%
June	15	13%
July	10	8%
August	9	8%
September	4	3%
October	9	8%
November	8	7%
December	13	11%
Age
Unknown	36	30%
10–19	9	8%
20–29	36	30%
30–39	22	18%
40–49	12	10%
50–59	2	2%
60–69	1	1%
70–79	1	1%
Total	119	100%

== Executions in recent years ==
Number of executions
1908	116
1907	119
1906	127
Total	362

Preceded by 1906	List of people executed in the United States in 1907	Succeeded by 1908
