= Capital punishment in Minnesota =

Capital punishment in Minnesota was abolished in 1911. Between 1854 and Minnesota's final execution in 1906, at least 70 people were executed in the Minnesota Territory and the State of Minnesota, all by hanging.

The first execution in Minnesota's history was the 1854 hanging of a Native American man, known in Anglicanized spelling as Uhazy or Yuhagu, for murder. As Minnesota was still a territory in 1854, this was the only recorded execution to have taken place in Minnesota before statehood in 1858, and all other recorded executions took place in the State of Minnesota.

The final execution to take place in Minnesota's history was the 1906 hanging of William Williams. Williams' botched execution contributed to public opinion in the state turning against the death penalty. In 1911, an abolition bill was signed into law, outlawing the death penalty in Minnesota. Since 1911, lawmakers have drafted 23 bills attempting to reinstate the death penalty in Minnesota, but none of these bills have passed the Minnesota Legislature.

== History ==
=== 1854: First documented execution in Minnesota ===
The first documented execution to take place in Minnesota was the December 29, 1854, hanging of Uhazy (also known as Yuhagu), a Dakota man who was convicted of the murder of a white woman. The execution took place in Minnesota Territory, as Minnesota had not yet been granted statehood.

Uhazy's execution was initially slated to take place in the center of Saint Paul, Minnesota, but Territorial Governor Willis A. Gorman and several citizens protested the establishment of a public gallows in the middle of the city, as the public gallows had attracted a large crowd. Uhazy's execution was ultimately relocated to a prairie on the outskirts of Saint Paul; authorities rebuilt the gallows in the new location, and the execution took place at approximately 3:00 pm, before a diminished public crowd largely consisting of drunk citizens and children. Several newspapers in Minnesota protested the hanging, with one, the Daily Minnesota Pioneer, refusing to send reporters to Uhazy's execution due to their reticence to publish gruesome details. Another, the Minnesota Republican, published scant details and called the hanging "disgusting."

=== 1860: Hanging of Ann Bilansky ===
On March 23, 1860, Ann Bilansky was executed by hanging. Bilansky, who was convicted of murdering her husband Stanislaus by poisoning him with arsenic, was the only woman executed in the history of Minnesota as a territory or state. Her execution was controversial. In January 1860, two months before her execution, lawmakers attempted to abolish the death penalty for female defendants; the same day, State Senator J.H. Stevens introduced a bill to abolish the death penalty altogether. Neither bill was successful, both failing by a vote of 22–33. Her prosecuting attorney stated in a message to Governor Alexander Ramsey the day before her execution that he had "grave and serious doubts as to whether [Bilansky] had a fair trial."

Ramsey County Sheriff Aaron W. Tullis intended for her execution to be conducted in private within an enclosure at the Ramsey County jail, but the enclosure was not sufficiently high to prohibit many onlookers from viewing Bilansky's execution; between 1,500 and 2,000 people witnessed her death from around the enclosure, as well as 100 people who rushed to gain entry into the enclosure before its gates were closed to potential witnesses. After the execution, some onlookers took pieces of the rope as souvenirs.

=== 1862: Dakota War mass execution ===
On December 26, 1862, Minnesota was the site of the largest mass execution in United States history. On that day, 38 men, all Dakota men involved in the Dakota War of 1862, were simultaneously publicly executed by hanging on the same gallows in Mankato, Minnesota, after being convicted of various capital crimes including murder, being an accessory to murder, and kidnapping. The hangings were ordered by a military commission and technically overseen by the federal government rather than Minnesota's state government. Originally, 303 Dakota men were sentenced to death, but all but 39 of them received a reprieve from U.S. President Abraham Lincoln, and one additional man, identified as Tatemima, received a reprieve shortly before the execution of the other 38 men. Two more executions linked to the Dakota War, of Dakota men named Medicine Bottle and Shakopee III, took place on November 11, 1865.

After the mass executions in 1862, the men's bodies were placed in a shallow mass grave near the Minnesota River. Overnight, several physicians stole the bodies to use them for anatomical research.

After the mass executions, some historians determined that at least two of the 38 men were wrongfully executed as victims of mistaken identity. One of those men was known as Chaska or Caske (Dakota: Wicaƞḣpi Wastedaƞpi), whose death sentence had been commuted by President Lincoln days prior to the mass executions, although some historians and contemporaneous figures, including a white woman named Sarah F. Wakefield with whom Chaska was rumored to have had a romantic affair, speculate that Chaska's execution was a deliberate gesture of revenge for his interracial relationship. After Chaska's execution, a prison chaplain and missionary named Stephen Riggs penned a letter to Wakefield which, in part, reads: "In regard to the mistake by which Chaska was hung instead of another, I doubt whether I can satisfactorily explain it." Another explanation given for Chaska's wrongful execution was that another name by which he went, Caske (meaning "first-born son"), was shared by several other Dakota men, so when U.S. authorities called for Caske to step forward in preparation for his execution, the wrong man stepped forward. Another wrongfully executed man, Wasicuƞ (or Wa si' cun), a white man who had been adopted into a Dakota family as a child, was acquitted at trial but hanged anyway.

The trials have also come under retrospective scrutiny due to the fact that none of the Dakota men had legal representation, despite the Sixth Amendment to the United States Constitution guaranteeing all defendants the right to an attorney should they face charges. Henry Hastings Sibley, one of the main American officials overseeing the prosecution and execution of the Dakota men, believed that defendants facing military commissions were not guaranteed the right to an attorney; one defendant made a request for an attorney, and he was denied. Another defendant, David Faribault, recounted after the trials that during court proceedings, he did not fully understand the gravity of his charges against him or the potentially deadly consequences of any confessions or admissions. Carol Chomsky, a law professor at the University of Minnesota, speculated that if Faribault, a mixed-race defendant who was fluent in English and received a European-based and American-based education, did not understand the proceedings, many of the executed defendants, some of whom did not understand English, did not understand the proceedings either.

In 2019, the Dakota people received an apology from Minnesota governor Tim Walz for the mass hanging, with the state government apologizing for "150 years of trauma inflicted on Native people at the hands of state government".

=== 1868–1885: Unofficial moratorium on executions ===
On February 3, 1868, State Representative N.H. Miner proposed the abolition of capital punishment in all cases except those where the jury verdict specifically demanded the death penalty. According to the bill Miner proposed, those who were not sentenced to death were to be sentenced to "life imprisonment at hard labor," forced into solitary confinement for 12 days a year, and only given a diet of bread and water. Five days later, the bill passed Minnesota’s House of Representatives by a vote of 28–8, and on March 4, 1868, Minnesota’s Senate voted 13–3 to pass the bill. It was officially signed into law on March 5, 1868, and effective immediately after ratification, although it did not apply retroactively and did not have any effect on an execution that took place the next day, that of Andreas Roesch.

However, Roesch's execution was the last to occur in Minnesota for 17 years. During that time, several lawmakers made multiple attempts to repeal the law, to no avail. Minnesota's Governor Cushman K. Davis called for its repeal and noted in 1876 that the law had effectively stalled capital punishment in the state, and his successor, Governor John S. Pillsbury, also unsuccessfully called for the law's repeal. Public demand for the law's repeal increased in 1877 after brothers Cole, James, and Robert Younger murdered two people during an attempted bank robbery and were sentenced to life imprisonment. Bills to repeal the law were introduced several times, including in 1869, 1877, and 1879.

On January 9, 1883, State Senator James O'Brien authored the final bill to repeal the 1868 law; the bill, which mandated capital punishment for first-degree murder in any case where "exceptional circumstances" did not provide the basis for a defendant receiving a life sentence instead, was ratified on March 3, 1883. On March 9, 1885, the law was codified into the Minnesota Constitution. The first execution to take place after the passage of the new bill was the August 28, 1885, hanging of convicted murderer John Waisenen.

=== 1889: Gag law ===
In 1889, State Representative John Day Smith sponsored a bill to introduce a gag law in Minnesota. The gag law would prohibit journalists from attending executions, and journalists were only permitted to report basic information on executions with no details. Day's intention with the law was to discourage members of the public from witnessing executions or causing a public stir over executions by suppressing information about capital punishment in the state. The law also decreed that executions could only take place in the early morning hours. The gag law, named the John Day Smith Law and also nicknamed the "midnight assassination law" due to its provisions on when executions could take place, passed later in 1889 and remained in effect until Minnesota abolished the death penalty.

=== 1906: Botched execution of William Williams ===
On February 13, 1906, William Williams was executed by hanging in the Ramsey County jail. Williams had been convicted of the murder of 16-year-old John Keller and Keller's mother Mary. After Williams dropped through the trap door, the rope used to hang him proved to be too long as Ramsey County Sheriff Anton Miesen had miscalculated its length, and Williams's neck stretched as well, leading his feet to make contact with the floor below the gallows. Three sheriff's deputies working for Ramsey County took turns hoisting the rope upward so Williams would be suspended in the air, causing him to slowly strangle to death. Williams took over 14 minutes to die. After the execution, Williams's attorney called his hanging "a disgrace to civilization," and several newspapers compared hanging as a method of execution to torture methods during the Inquisition. Following Williams's execution, three Minnesota newspapers were fined $25 each for violating the John Day Smith Law and reporting details about how Williams's execution transpired.

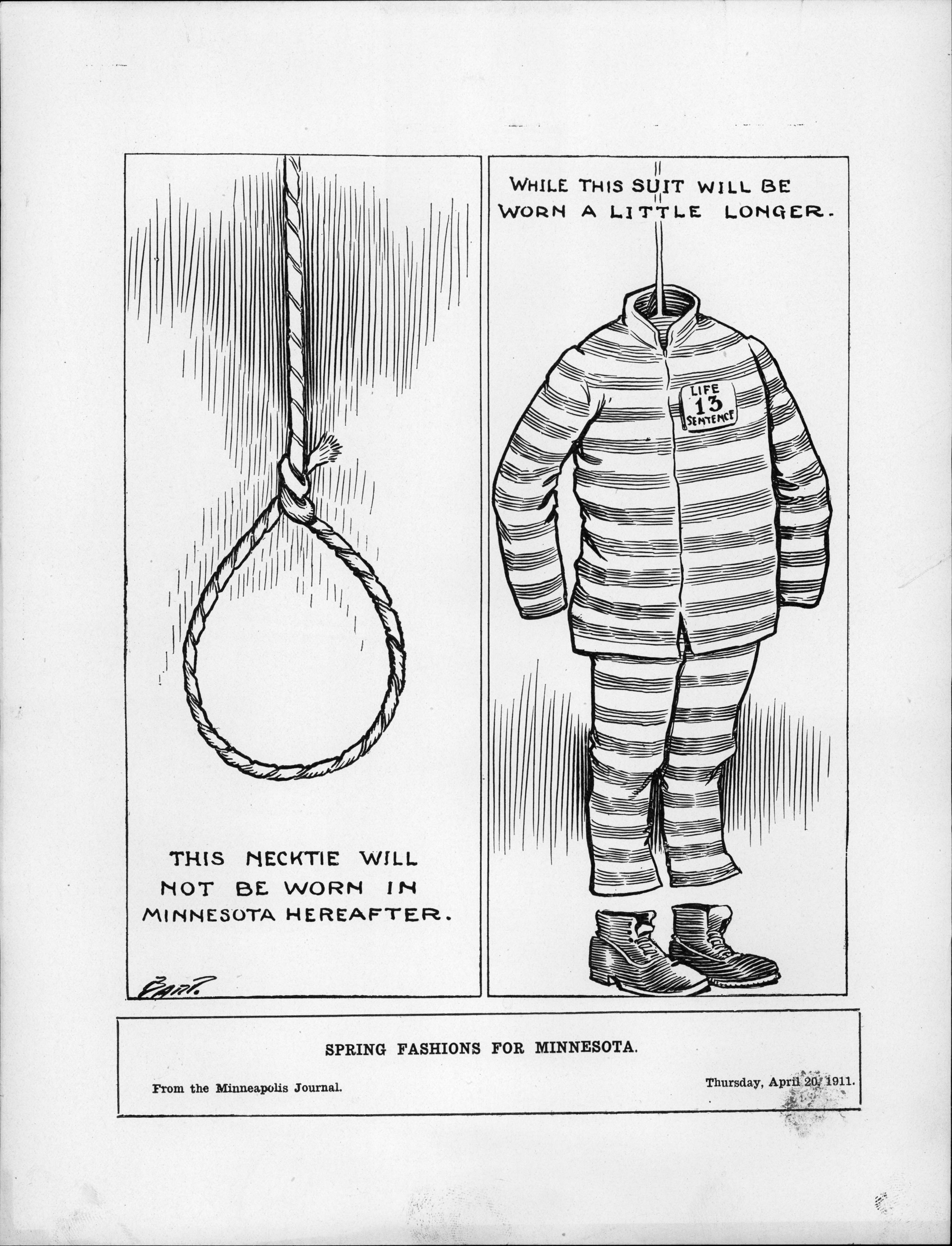
1911 cartoon

=== 1911: Abolition of capital punishment ===
Despite the John Day Smith Law prohibiting the presence of reporters at executions, a journalist working for the St. Paul Daily News had surreptitiously gained entry to William Williams's execution and directly witnessed Williams's gruesome death. The public sympathized with Williams's story, with many purportedly finding the elements of "love and heartbreak" to be "relatable," and members of the public began to view the death penalty as a cruel and inefficient punishment that did not deter crime.

Following Williams's execution, Governor John Albert Johnson held a meeting with Sheriff Miesen to understand what went wrong with Williams's execution. Afterwards, he commuted several active Minnesota death sentences to life imprisonment, and his successor, Adolph Olson Eberhart, commuted the remaining death sentences; Johnson specifically called the death penalty "[a] survival of the relic of the past." In 1911, State Representative George MacKenzie authored a bill to abolish the death penalty, and on April 22, 1911, Governor Eberhart signed it into law, thereby abolishing capital punishment in the state. Williams was the last person to be executed in Minnesota's history. No executions have taken place in Minnesota since his hanging in 1906.

== Recent developments ==
Since Minnesota's abolition of the death penalty, several high-profile murders have caused lawmakers and the public to demand the return of capital punishment; the state legislature drafted unsuccessful bills to reinstate capital punishment in 1913, 1915, 1919, 1921, 1923, 1927, 1931, 1933, 1937, 1974, 1975, 1986, 1989, 1991, 1992, 1995, 1996, 1999, 2001, 2003, 2004, and 2005. The 2003 effort followed a highly publicized triple murder in Long Prairie, Minnesota.

In 2011, Minnesota Governor Tim Pawlenty, a member of the conservative Republican Party, called for Minnesota to reinstate the death penalty. Another member of Minnesota's Republican Party, Tom Neuville, who was a state senator and the leading committee member of Minnesota's Senate Judiciary Committee, publicly opposed Pawlenty's calls to reinstate capital punishment, stating, "If we solve violence by becoming violent ourselves, we become diminished. . . . Life is a gift from God. It isn't up to us to take it away. Whether you take an innocent life of a baby, or of a person who has committed a heinous act, it is still an act at our hands, and it makes us a less caring and less sensitive society."

== See also ==
- Capital punishment in the United States
- Capital punishment by country
- List of people executed in Minnesota
