= Ann Bilansky =

American housewife and murderer

- Born: Mary Ann Evards Wright c. 1820; Fayetteville, North Carolina
- Died: March 23, 1860; Saint Paul, Minnesota
- Cause of death: Execution by hanging
- Occupation: Housewife
- Spouse: Stanislaus Bilansky
- Conviction: First degree murder
- Penalty: Death

Ann Bilansky (born Mary Ann Evards Wright) (c. 1820 – March 23, 1860) was an American housewife convicted in 1859 of poisoning her husband with arsenic. She is the only woman in Minnesota to receive the death penalty and the first white person in the state to be executed by hanging.

== Biography ==
Mary Ann Evards Wright (known by her middle name, Ann) was born in Fayetteville, North Carolina, where she resided for several years with her first husband who later died in a railroad incident. She then moved to Pleasant Hill, Illinois, and then finally to St. Paul, Minnesota, in April 1858 at the request of her nephew, John Walker, who was ill with typhoid fever. Shortly after, Ann married Stanislaus Bilansky, one of the first Polish immigrants to settle in St. Paul. He had moved to St. Paul from Wisconsin in 1848. Stanislaus was a poor man who drank heavily, but he owned a small cabin that doubled as a bar and grocery store. He had custody of his three young children left in his care after his second wife divorced him, and Ann frequently took care of the children when Stanislaus was ill or working. In 1859, Stanislaus was sick between March 6 and March 11 with what was thought to be indigestion, but his condition worsened rapidly as he consumed both alcohol and Graffenburg pills. Ann was seen crying at his bedside asking what she should do with the kids in case anything happened. Stanislaus died on March 11.

== The trial ==
As the funeral procession was leaving the Bilansky residence to bury Stanislaus at the cemetery, officials from the Ramsey County coroner's office arrived to conduct an inquest. A doctor examined the body and a coroner's jury was assembled to hear testimony from John Walker, a visiting neighbor named Lucinda Kilpatrick, and a housekeeper hired during Stanislaus’ illness named Rosa Scharf. The coroner's jury found that Stanislaus died of natural causes, but questioned why Ann had not called a doctor toward the end of his illness. Stanislaus was then buried on March 12, but that evening Kilpatrick changed her testimony to claim she saw Ann buying arsenic from a drugstore on February 28. Ann claimed the purchase was at Stanislaus’ urging, so they might kill rats in the cellar. After taking Kilpatrick's new testimony, Stanislaus’ body was exhumed for an examination and on March 13, Ann was arrested for the murder of her husband.

A second coroner's jury convened to hear testimonies from Scharf and Kilpatrick, as well as from druggist W.H. Wolff and Dr. J.D. Goodrich. Wolff testified that a single crystal was found under a microscope that “resembled arsenic,” but Goodrich was skeptical that Stanislaus was poisoned. The jury concluded that Stanislaus died of arsenic poisoning, a grand jury indicted Ann for the murder of her husband and a trial date was set for May 23.

The trial was conducted at the Ramsey County courthouse, and the prosecution, led by Isaac Heard, included three main arguments in their case against Ann: she had purchased arsenic and had the means to kill, she had inappropriate relations with Walker and therefore an affair gave her the motive for murder, and she had made comments that suggested she was contemplating murder. Kilpatrick was the state's principal witness, and Heard also relied heavily on Scharf's testimony, which stated that Ann made all of Stanislaus’ meals separately and washed his dishes and utensils separately. Scharf also testified that Bilansky did not treat Stanislaus as a husband ought to be treated. Both Kilpatrick and Scharf testified Ann was having an affair with Walker, which County Attorney Heard argued was the murder motive. After all of the witnesses had spoken, an all-male jury began deliberations on June 3, and they took less than six hours to return with a “guilty” verdict. Upon hearing the verdict, Ann reportedly showed no visible signs of emotion or distress. Ann's defense asked for a new trial, but did not receive one as the judge considered her already found guilty in the court. Bilansky's attorney went before the Minnesota Supreme Court to try and prevent judge from imposing the death penalty, but Justices declined to intervene. Ann briefly escaped from the county jail on July 25. She hid near Como Lake and eventually made contact with Walker, but was recaptured in his company on August 1.

== Sentencing ==
On December 2, Ann appeared in court for her sentencing where she proclaimed herself an innocent woman: “If I die in this case, I die an innocent woman. I don’t think I have had a fair and just trial.” She was sentenced to one month in solitary confinement followed by death by hanging. Governor Henry Sibley had the legal responsibility of setting the execution date, but he refused to set a date or commute the sentence, and he let his term expire at the end of 1859. The Minnesota House of Representatives made efforts to end capital punishment, but it was rejected shortly after. On January 18, 1860 another bill was introduced to prohibit the execution of women but was tabled. On January 25, 1860 newly elected Governor Alexander Ramsey set Ann’s execution date as March 23, 1860. Another bill was passed by the state legislature on March 5 to try and help Ann, which stated that the first execution by Minnesota should not be that of a woman and that Ann had an unfair trial, but this was vetoed by Governor Ramsey on March 8.

== Execution ==
Ann requested a private execution, but at this point in the 19th century public executions were typical as they served civil and religious purposes to deter crime and demonstrate the danger of sin. On March 23, 1860, gallows were set up in an enclosure in Court House Square at the corner of Fifth and Cedar streets, and just before her execution Ann spoke her last words: “I die without having had any mercy shown me, or justice. I die for the good of my soul, and not for murder. . . . Your courts of justice are not courts of justice—but I will yet get justice in Heaven.” Around 100 onlookers watched from inside the enclosure, while thousands more watched from outside the enclosure. Ann's body was left hanging for twenty minutes before she was buried in an unmarked grave in Calvary Cemetery.

== Reaction from the press ==
Throughout Ann's entire trial and execution, the St. Paul Pioneer and Democrat focused heavily on her gender. She was heavily criticized for her “lack of marital virtue,” and at times the press was more focused on Bilansky's adultery than on her decision to commit murder. The Democrat also criticized other women for their eagerness to watch the execution. The day after the execution, the Democrat grew tired of the story, stating that it hoped to never have to report about Bilansky or the execution ever again.

== In popular culture ==
Ann Bilansky's trial and execution was the basis for Jeffrey Hatcher's stage play, A Piece of Rope, which premiered in St. Paul in March 2000.
