= List of people executed in the United States in 1908 =

One hundred and sixteen people, all male, were executed in the United States in 1908, one hundred and three by hanging, and thirteen by electrocution.

== List of people executed in the United States in 1908 ==
No.	Date of execution	Name	Age of person			Gender	Ethnicity	State	Method	Ref.
No.	Date of execution	Name	At execution	At offense	Age difference	Gender	Ethnicity	State	Method	Ref.
1	January 3, 1908	Clarence Sturgeon	22	21	1	Male	White	Kentucky	Hanging	
2	January 3, 1908	Lee H. Coleman	Unknown	Unknown	0	Male	White	Louisiana	Hanging	
3	January 3, 1908	Faint Hopkins	Unknown	Unknown	1	Male	Black	Mississippi	Hanging	
4	January 3, 1908	Henry "Will Washington" Turner	Unknown	Unknown	5	Male	Black	Mississippi	Hanging	
5	January 11, 1908	Peter W. Turner	37	36	1	Male	Black	Tennessee	Hanging	
6	January 17, 1908	Frank Barker	31	27	4	Male	White	Nebraska	Hanging	
7	January 18, 1908	George Kenny	19	18	1	Male	Black	South Carolina	Hanging	
8	January 23, 1908	Saverio Curcio	20	18	2	Male	White	Pennsylvania	Hanging	
9	January 31, 1908	Arthur Price Glover	55	53	2	Male	White	Georgia	Hanging	
10	February 4, 1908	George James Stewart	22	21	1	Male	Black	New Jersey	Electrocution	
11	February 4, 1908	John Culpepper	Unknown	Unknown	1	Male	Black	Louisiana	Hanging	
12	February 4, 1908	Calvin Thomas	Unknown	Unknown	1	Male	Black	Louisiana	Hanging	
13	February 4, 1908	Albert West	Unknown	Unknown	1	Male	Black	Louisiana	Hanging	
14	February 4, 1908	Edmond Williams	Unknown	Unknown	1	Male	Black	Louisiana	Hanging	
15	February 10, 1908	Henry Thaxton	Unknown	Unknown	2	Male	Black	Alabama	Hanging	
16	February 14, 1908	Charles Summerlin	Unknown	Unknown	0	Male	Black	Georgia	Hanging	
17	February 14, 1908	Wes Summerlin	Unknown	Unknown	0	Male	Black	Georgia	Hanging	
18	February 14, 1908	George Midgets	Unknown	Unknown	2	Male	Black	Virginia	Hanging	
19	February 20, 1908	William H. Handy	32	31	1	Male	Black	Pennsylvania	Hanging	
20	February 20, 1908	William H. Johnson	Unknown	Unknown	Unknown	Male	Black	Pennsylvania	Hanging	
21	February 25, 1908	Willie Rogers	25	23	2	Male	White	Georgia	Hanging	
22	February 25, 1908	Gilbert Matticks	45	44	1	Male	Black	New Jersey	Electrocution	
23	February 27, 1908	John Carmack	29	27	2	Male	Black	Tennessee	Hanging	
24	February 27, 1908	Edward Turner	24	23	1	Male	White	Tennessee	Hanging	
25	February 28, 1908	Lee Holmes	29	28	1	Male	Black	Georgia	Hanging	
26	February 28, 1908	Edward A. Wilson	29	28	1	Male	Black	Maryland	Hanging	
27	March 3, 1908	George Wilson	37	37	0	Male	Black	New Jersey	Electrocution	
28	March 5, 1908	Luigi Ferruchi	19	17	2	Male	White	Pennsylvania	Hanging	
29	March 9, 1908	Michael Tomassi	25	24	1	Male	White	New Jersey	Electrocution	
30	March 9, 1908	Antonio Strollo	24	22	2	Male	White	New York	Electrocution	
31	March 10, 1908	Jung Jow	27	25	2	Male	Asian	Pennsylvania	Hanging	
32	March 10, 1908	Mock Kung	27	25	2	Male	Asian	Pennsylvania	Hanging	
33	March 12, 1908	Morris B. Holmes	19	18	1	Male	White	Pennsylvania	Hanging	
34	March 12, 1908	Charles Werzel	33	32	1	Male	White	Pennsylvania	Hanging	
35	March 18, 1908	Andrew Johnson	Unknown	Unknown	0	Male	Black	Georgia	Hanging	
36	March 20, 1908	Mack Brown	Unknown	Unknown	0	Male	Black	Georgia	Hanging	
37	March 20, 1908	Ingram Canida	20	19	1	Male	Black	Georgia	Hanging	
38	March 23, 1908	Joseph Paolucci	31	29	2	Male	White	District of Columbia	Hanging	
39	March 23, 1908	John McPherson	26	24	2	Male	White	Tennessee	Hanging	
40	March 27, 1908	John H. Brown	31	30	1	Male	Black	Texas	Hanging	
41	March 30, 1908	Chester Ellsworth Gillette	24	22	2	Male	White	New York	Electrocution	
42	April 7, 1908	Max Soifer	21	20	1	Male	White	Pennsylvania	Hanging	
43	April 7, 1908	Joseph Talrico	Unknown	Unknown	1	Male	White	Pennsylvania	Hanging	
44	April 9, 1908	Warrick Brooks	29	Unknown	Unknown	Male	Black	Pennsylvania	Hanging	
45	April 10, 1908	Leo C. Thurman	25	23	2	Male	White	Virginia	Hanging	
46	April 16, 1908	Sam Murchison	Unknown	Unknown	0	Male	Black	North Carolina	Hanging	
47	April 17, 1908	Robert Golatt	42	Unknown	Unknown	Male	Black	Georgia	Hanging	
48	April 24, 1908	Tobe Stevens	Unknown	Unknown	0	Male	Black	Louisiana	Hanging	
49	April 28, 1908	William Smith	42	41	1	Male	White	Pennsylvania	Hanging	
50	May 1, 1908	Arthella C. DuBose	Unknown	Unknown	Unknown	Male	Black	Alabama	Hanging	
51	May 1, 1908	Gaddy Graham	35	34	1	Male	Black	South Carolina	Hanging	
52	May 1, 1908	Ned Toland	19	19	0	Male	Black	South Carolina	Hanging	
53	May 1, 1908	Brack Toland	17	17	0	Male	Black	South Carolina	Hanging	
54	May 5, 1908	Frank Paese	39	38	1	Male	White	Pennsylvania	Hanging	
55	May 5, 1908	Dominic Ramunno	Unknown	Unknown	2	Male	White	Pennsylvania	Hanging	
56	May 8, 1908	Henry Campbell	54	54	0	Male	Black	Georgia	Hanging	
57	May 15, 1908	Porter Cooper	Unknown	Unknown	0	Male	Black	Georgia	Hanging	
58	May 26, 1908	Peter Celop	22	21	1	Male	White	Pennsylvania	Hanging	
59	May 26, 1908	Felix Radzius	19	18	1	Male	White	Pennsylvania	Hanging	
60	May 29, 1908	James Bennett Cason	35	34	1	Male	White	Texas	Hanging	
61	June 2, 1908	Orrin Warren "Ora" Odell	39	37	2	Male	White	Pennsylvania	Hanging	
62	June 4, 1908	William Jeffries	28	24	4	Male	White	Missouri	Hanging	
63	June 12, 1908	Frank Ford	26	25	1	Male	Black	Oklahoma	Hanging	
64	June 15, 1908	George J. Rock	35	35	0	Male	White	Montana	Hanging	
65	June 19, 1908	Sonnie Williams	Unknown	Unknown	1	Male	Black	Georgia	Hanging	
66	June 20, 1908	Tom Jones	Unknown	Unknown	0	Male	Black	Texas	Hanging	
67	June 23, 1908	Harry E. Lyles	27	26	1	Male	White	Georgia	Hanging	
68	June 28, 1908	Henry "Monk" Gibson	19	16	3	Male	Black	Texas	Hanging	
69	June 29, 1908	Albert Brown	23	23	0	Male	Black	District of Columbia	Hanging	
70	June 29, 1908	Richard Gregory	37	36	1	Male	Black	District of Columbia	Hanging	
71	July 1, 1908	John Washelesky	32	27	5	Male	White	Connecticut	Hanging	
72	July 2, 1908	Willis Macklin	Unknown	Unknown	2	Male	Black	Texas	Hanging	
73	July 14, 1908	Rosario Sergi	18	16	2	Male	White	Pennsylvania	Hanging	
74	July 15, 1908	Giuseppe Alia	56	56	0	Male	White	Colorado	Hanging	
75	July 17, 1908	Edward "Frank Johnson" Walton	Unknown	Unknown	0	Male	Black	West Virginia	Hanging	
76	July 20, 1908	Angelo Laudiero	27	25	2	Male	White	New York	Electrocution	
77	July 20, 1908	Charles H. Rogers	38	35	3	Male	White	New York	Electrocution	
78	July 24, 1908	Lorenzo Rossi	31	31	0	Male	White	Connecticut	Hanging	
79	July 31, 1908	Louis V. Dabner	18	17	1	Male	White	California	Hanging	
80	July 31, 1908	John Siemsen	28	26	2	Male	White	California	Hanging	
81	July 31, 1908	James Williams	27	27	0	Male	Black	Texas	Hanging	
82	August 1, 1908	Frank Mitchell	Unknown	Unknown	Unknown	Male	Black	Texas	Hanging	
83	August 8, 1908	Henry Johnson	19	18	1	Male	Black	Tennessee	Hanging	
84	August 18, 1908	Mikola Holka	20	19	1	Male	White	Pennsylvania	Hanging	
85	August 28, 1908	Delfine Albitre	27	25	2	Male	Hispanic	California	Hanging	
86	August 28, 1908	John Hopkins	38	38	0	Male	White	Oklahoma	Hanging	
87	September 11, 1908	Constantino Borsei	27	27	0	Male	White	California	Hanging	
88	September 11, 1908	Neal Ryals	42	41	1	Male	Black	Georgia	Hanging	
89	September 11, 1908	Lee Strother	Unknown	Unknown	Unknown	Male	Black	Virginia	Hanging	
90	September 21, 1908	Albert Filley	33	32	1	Male	White	Missouri	Hanging	
91	September 22, 1908	Ned Bowles	Unknown	Unknown	Unknown	Male	Black	Mississippi	Hanging	
92	September 22, 1908	Jim Burleson	Unknown	Unknown	Unknown	Male	Black	Mississippi	Hanging	
93	October 8, 1908	James Lynn	50	50	0	Male	Black	Colorado	Hanging	
94	October 9, 1908	Leon Harrison	23	23	0	Male	Black	Georgia	Hanging	
95	October 13, 1908	Henry Smith	22	Unknown	Unknown	Male	Black	Virginia	Electrocution	
96	October 15, 1908	Jim Bennett	23	23	0	Male	Black	Georgia	Hanging	
97	October 23, 1908	Joe James	17	17	0	Male	Black	Illinois	Hanging	
98	October 23, 1908	Edward Ayles	Unknown	Unknown	1	Male	Black	Louisiana	Hanging	
99	October 23, 1908	Robert Hall	Unknown	Unknown	Unknown	Male	Black	Louisiana	Hanging	
100	October 23, 1908	Edward Honore	Unknown	Unknown	Unknown	Male	Black	Louisiana	Hanging	
101	October 23, 1908	Ernest Montgomery	31	Unknown	Unknown	Male	Black	Louisiana	Hanging	
102	October 23, 1908	Jacques Pierre	Unknown	Unknown	Unknown	Male	Black	Louisiana	Hanging	
103	October 29, 1908	Salvatore Garrito	Unknown	Unknown	1	Male	White	Pennsylvania	Hanging	
104	October 29, 1908	Richard McKwayne	24	23	1	Male	Black	Pennsylvania	Hanging	
105	October 30, 1908	Winston Green	17	17	0	Male	Black	Virginia	Electrocution	
106	November 16, 1908	Andrea Del Vermo	24	22	2	Male	White	New York	Electrocution	
107	November 20, 1908	Lewis Fletcher	Unknown	Unknown	0	Male	Black	North Carolina	Hanging	
108	November 27, 1908	Will Herring	Unknown	Unknown	0	Male	Black	South Carolina	Hanging	
109	November 28, 1908	William Sobert Brasch	25	23	2	Male	White	New York	Electrocution	
110	December 11, 1908	George Joiner	21	21	0	Male	Black	Georgia	Hanging	
111	December 11, 1908	Will Johnson	Unknown	Unknown	0	Male	Black	Oklahoma	Hanging	
112	December 18, 1908	Frank Bryant	26	26	0	Male	White	Illinois	Hanging	
113	December 18, 1908	Will Graham	19	Unknown	Unknown	Male	Black	North Carolina	Hanging	
114	December 21, 1908	John Zett	48	48	0	Male	White	Connecticut	Hanging	
115	December 22, 1908	Giacinto Ricci	35	35	0	Male	White	New Jersey	Electrocution	
116	December 28, 1908	Fletcher Willis	Unknown	Unknown	0	Male	Black	Georgia	Hanging	

== Demographics ==
Gender
Male	116	100%
Female	0	0%
Ethnicity
Black	67	58%
White	46	40%
Asian	2	2%
Hispanic	1	1%
State
Pennsylvania	21	18%
Georgia	18	16%
Louisiana	11	9%
Texas	7	6%
New York	6	5%
New Jersey	5	4%
South Carolina	5	4%
Tennessee	5	4%
Virginia	5	4%
California	4	3%
Mississippi	4	3%
Connecticut	3	3%
District of Columbia	3	3%
North Carolina	3	3%
Oklahoma	3	3%
Alabama	2	2%
Colorado	2	2%
Illinois	2	2%
Missouri	2	2%
Kentucky	1	1%
Maryland	1	1%
Montana	1	1%
Nebraska	1	1%
West Virginia	1	1%
Method
Hanging	103	89%
Electrocution	13	11%
Month
January	9	8%
February	17	15%
March	15	13%
April	8	7%
May	11	9%
June	10	9%
July	11	9%
August	5	4%
September	6	5%
October	13	11%
November	4	3%
December	7	6%
Age
Unknown	37	32%
10–19	13	11%
20–29	37	32%
30–39	20	17%
40–49	5	4%
50–59	4	3%
Total	116	100%

== Executions in recent years ==
Number of executions
1909	138
1908	116
1907	119
Total	373

Preceded by 1907	List of people executed in the United States in 1908	Succeeded by 1909
