= Sarah F. Wakefield =

American writer

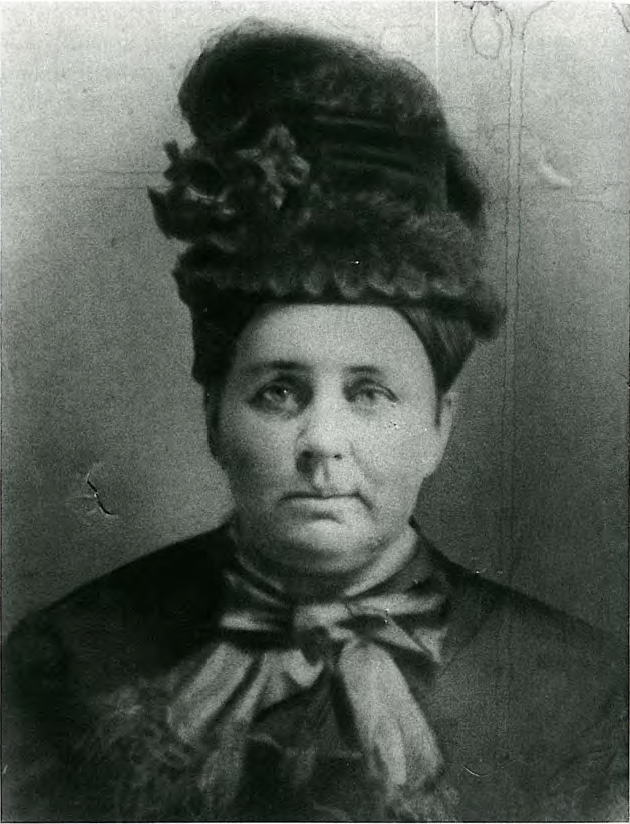
Sarah F. Wakefield

Sarah F. Wakefield (September 29, 1829–May 27, 1899) was an American woman who was taken captive for six weeks during the Dakota War of 1862 and was a writer of Six Weeks in the Sioux Tepees: A Narrative of Indian Captivity. She testified for Chaska (We-Chank-Wash-ta-don-pee), who held her for six weeks. Although his sentence was commuted, he was hanged with 37 other men following the trial.

== Early years ==
Sarah F. Brown was born on September 29, 1829, in Kingston, Rhode Island. Her parents were Sarah and William Brown. She left Rhode Island in 1854, due to a disagreement with her mother that left them uncommunicative.

== Marriage ==
She moved to Minnesota in 1854, where she met Dr. John Luman Wakefield, whose brother was James Wakefield, an attorney. She married him in Shakopee, Minnesota in 1856, becoming Sarah F. Wakefield. Her husband, a graduate of Yale University Medical School, was from Winsted, Connecticut. He had a medical practice in Shakopee, was a land speculator, and was a legislator. The family was amongst the first settlers of Big Earth City and Dr. Wakefield worked as a physician at Yellow Medicine, an Upper Sioux Agency. Having moved in 1861, they lived in a well-appointed house, on a bluff, next to the Agency building, at the confluence of the Yellow Medicine and Minnesota Rivers.

Wakefield was described as:

Gregarious to strangers, prone to anxiety, and fiercely protective of her two young children, she was plain-looking and stout enough that the Dakota called her Tanka-Winohinca Waste, meaning "large good woman."

— Scott W. Berg, 38 nooses : Lincoln, Little Crow, and the beginning of the frontier's end

The couple had four children:

- James O Wakefield, born in 1857
- Lucy E Wakefield, born in 1860
- Julia E Wakefield, born about 1866
- John R Wakefield, born about 1868

== Dakota War of 1862 ==
When the Dakota War of 1862 broke out, Wakefield fled with her children towards Fort Ridgely, escorted by an agency clerk, George Gleason. Chaska (We-Chank-Wash-ta-don-pee), a Dakota man, held Wakefield and her children with his family during the six-week battle. After the war, the three Wakefields were returned to Camp Release. During a trial after the war, Wakefield testified that Chaska was her protector, which played a part in his sentence being commuted. Whether confusion with a man named Chaskadon or done intentionally, Chaska was hanged with 37 others at Mankato, Minnesota. Wakefield was vilified for standing up for Chaska.

== Death ==
After her husband died in 1875, Wakefield moved to St. Paul, Minnesota. She died there on May 27, 1899.

== Sources ==
- Berg, Scott W. (2012). 38 nooses : Lincoln, Little Crow, and the beginning of the frontier's end. New York: Pantheon Books. ISBN 978-0-307-37724-1.
