= John Day Smith =

American politician (1845–1933)

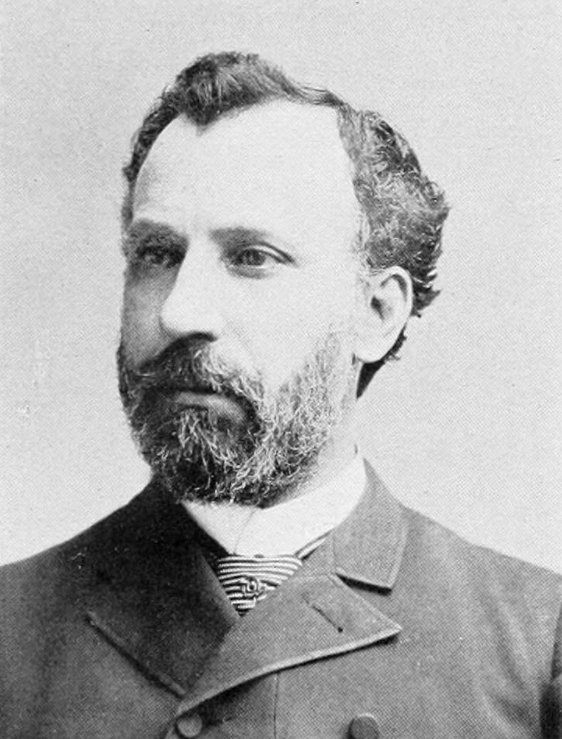

Member of the Minnesota Senate for District 34
- In office 1891–1894

Member of the Minnesota House of Representatives for District 29
- In office 1889–1890

Personal details
- Born: February 25, 1845 Litchfield, Maine, U.S.
- Died: March 5, 1933 (aged 88) Minneapolis, Minnesota, U.S.
- Resting place: Lakewood Cemetery
- Party: Republican
- Spouses: Mary Hardy Chadbourne (m. 1872; died 1874) Laura Bean (m. 1879)
- Children: 5
- Education: Brown University; Columbian Law School
- Occupation: Lawyer, politician
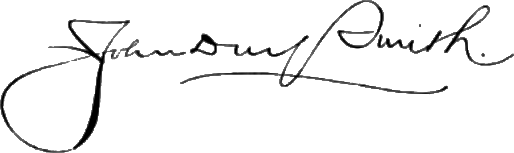
- Signature

John Day Smith (February 25, 1845 – March 5, 1933) was an American lawyer, academic, politician, and jurist who was a member of the Minnesota House of Representatives from 1889 to 1890 and the Minnesota Senate from 1891 to 1894.

== Early life ==
Smith was born in Litchfield, Kennebec County, Maine on February 25, 1845. He went to the Litchfield public schools and attended the Litchfield Academy for one term.

== Civil War ==
Smith served in the 19th Maine Infantry Regiment during the American Civil War. He participated in the battles of Fredericksburg, the Wilderness, Cold Harbor, and Petersburg. He was wounded at the Battle of Gettysburg and severely injured at the Battle of Jerusalem Plank Road. He spent the remainder of his service in the hospital. He was discharged with the rank of corporal on April 25, 1865.

== Teaching ==
After the war, Smith attended the Waterville Classical Institute. He graduated in 1868 and attended Colby College for two years before transferring to Brown University. During this time, he also served as principal of the Gardiner Academy (1867) and the Monmouth Academy (1869–1870). He graduated from Brown in 1872. During his senior year, he became the principal of the Worcester Academy.

== Washington, D.C. ==
Smith became seriously ill in November 1874 and was advised to go to the Southern United States to recover. He spent a year working for the United States Department of the Interior in Washington, D.C., then studied at the Columbian Law School. He received his Bachelor of Laws in 1878 and Master of Laws in 1881. From 1882 to 1885, he taught constitutional law at Howard University.

== Minnesota ==
In 1886, Smith moved to Minneapolis. From 1888 to 1905, he was a lecturer on American constitutional law at the University of Minnesota. In 1895, he was associate counsel for accused murderer Harry T. Hayward. Hayward was convicted and executed on December 11, 1895.

Smith served in the Minnesota House of Representatives in 1889 and 1890. In 1889, he sponsored a bill to introduce a gag law prohibiting journalists from attending executions. His intention was to discourage members of the public from witnessing executions or causing a public stir over executions by suppressing information about capital punishment. The law also decreed that executions could only take place in the early morning hours. The gag law, named the John Day Smith Law and also nicknamed the "midnight assassination law" due to its provisions on when executions could take place, passed later in 1889 and remained in effect until Minnesota abolished the death penalty. He was a member of the Minnesota Senate from 1891 to 1894. He was chair of the senate judiciary committee during his final term. He then served as a Minnesota District Court judge.

Smith was commander of the Minnesota Grand Army of the Republic in 1893 and president of the state chapter of the Sons of the American Revolution in 1907.

== Personal life and death ==
He married Mary Hardy Chadbourne in 1872, and they had one daughter. Mary died in 1874, and he remarried to Laura Bean on September 16, 1879. They had a son and three daughters.

Smith died at his home in Minneapolis on March 5, 1933, and was buried at Lakewood Cemetery.

== Works ==
- Cases on Constitutional Law (1896)
- The History of the Nineteenth Regiment of Maine Volunteer Infantry, 1862-1865 (1909)
