= Harry T. Hayward =

19th-century American criminal and suspected serial killer

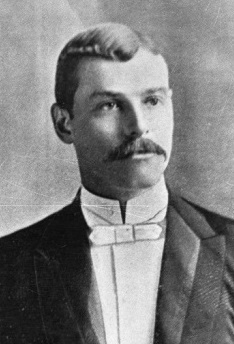
- Photograph of Hayward (1895)
- Born: 1865; Macoupin County, Illinois, U.S.
- Died: December 11, 1895 (aged 29–30); Hennepin County Jail, Minnesota, U.S.
- Status: Executed by hanging
- Conviction: First degree murder
- Penalty: Death

Details
- Victims: 1–4
- Country: United States
- States: Minnesota (convicted); New York, New Jersey, California (confessed)

Harry T. Hayward (c. 1865 – December 11, 1895) was an American socialite during the Gilded Age, who lived a secret life as a gambler, arsonist, murderer, and suspected serial killer. Following his arrest and prosecution for masterminding one of America's most infamous crimes of the era—the 1894 murder for hire of dressmaker Catherine Ging—Hayward was dubbed by the newspapers of the era as the "Minneapolis Svengali" for his ability to manipulate others.

In the hours before his hanging at Hennepin County Jail in Minneapolis, Hayward gave a detailed interview to his cousin Edward Goodsell and a court reporter in which he admitted to numerous arsons, assaults, swindles, and three unsolved murders across three states.

== Early life ==
Harry T. Hayward was born circa 1865 in Macoupin County, Illinois, the son of William and Lodusky Hayward; his family moved to Minneapolis, Minnesota, when he was an infant. When Hayward was aged 6, his family briefly returned to Illinois and lived there for about a year. Following his return to Minneapolis, Hayward attended a private school for six months before transferring to a public school. Interviews with school acquaintances revealed accounts of Hayward engaging in bullying and torturing domestic animals.

Upon graduating high school, Hayward found a job as a clerk. However, by age 20, he had developed what in modern times would be considered a gambling addiction. Hayward began pursuing literature promoting atheism from an early age, the content of which he used to justify his self-centered worldview and criminal behavior. Despite briefly taking Catholic religious instruction while on death row, atheism remained his belief.

== Ging murder ==
In January 1894, Hayward met Catherine "Kitty" Ging, a tenant of his parents at the Ozark Flats building on Hennepin Avenue and Thirteenth Street. He persuaded her to front him large sums of money, which he used gambling. When Ging demanded the return of her money, Hayward paid her with counterfeit currency. Over time, although Hayward maintained a facade of friendship with Ging, he grew increasingly infuriated by her assertive nature and repeated demands for the repayment of her borrowed funds.

On December 3, 1894, Ging's body was found, shot behind the ear, on a road near Lake Calhoun. It was later revealed that Hayward had persuaded her to purchase a $10,000 life insurance policy which named him as sole beneficiary.

Hayward appeared to be in the forefront in the search for the killer. Contemporary accounts described Hayward as "a stalwart six-footer, handsome, nervy, erratic and reckless." He began playing up the fact that Kitty had borrowed money from him, and how he was certain someone killed her for it.

However, Harry's brother Adry confided to a family friend Levi Stewart that Harry had asked him to do away with Kitty. Stewart contacted the Hennepin County Attorney's office. Adry revealed that the actual killer was Claude Blixt. After the confession of Claude Blixt, he and Harry Hayward were arrested.

== Trial ==
Harry Hayward's trial for first degree murder began, before Judge Seagrave Smith, on January 21, 1895. Hennepin County Attorney Frank M. Nye appeared for the prosecution.

Hayward's defense team included William Erwin, known as "The Tall Pine Tree of the Northwest", and John Day Smith, a Baptist Deacon and Republican State Senator. Smith's experiences as a soldier during the American Civil War had inspired him to become Minnesota's foremost death penalty abolitionist.

The trial lasted 46 days and had 136 witnesses. The prosecution's main witnesses were triggerman Claus Blixt and Harry's older brother Adry Hayward. The defense unsuccessfully tried to have Adry Hayward's testimony ruled inadmissible, calling him "insane on the subject". After the defense took over, Hayward took the stand himself and denied all allegations.

On March 8, 1895, the jury found Hayward guilty of first degree murder. On March 11, Judge Smith sentenced him to death by hanging. In an interview the same day, Hayward described his outlook in characteristically detached terms: "You see I look upon the matter just as a gambler would. Before the jury brought in its verdict I considered I had just about ten chances of winning, but now I consider fully eight of them gone." He cited three remaining avenues: a motion for a new trial, an appeal to the Supreme Court, and a plea for executive clemency. He closed by saying he had "simply taken things philosophically as they came... And so I shall look at it up to the end."

== Interview ==
Prior to his execution, Hayward gave a detailed series of interviews to his cousin Edward H. Goodsell. During this conversation, he admitted to numerous acts of illegal gambling, arson and three other murders. Transcripts were taken down by a court stenographer.

His victims included a twenty-year-old "sporting girl" whom he met in Pasadena, California. Hayward claimed to have lured her into joining him for a buggy ride to a remote location in the Sierra Madre. Hayward shot her in the back of the head and buried her in a shallow grave. Hayward then made off with $7,000 which she had carried in her wallet.

Hayward also claimed to have fatally shot a "consumptive" whom he met on a train near Long Branch, New Jersey, robbed him of $2000, and disposed of his body in the Shrewsbury River.

According to Harold Schechter, "His most brutal crime, however, was the slaying of a 'Chinaman' in a New York City gambling joint on Mulberry Street. Getting into an altercation over a card game, Harry, 'knocked the Chinaman down and kicked him in the stomach.' He then picked up a chair and jabbed the pointed end of one wooden leg into the man's eye. Then, while he was, 'down and howling," Harry sat down on the chair. 'His skull was kind of thin,' Harry related with a chuckle, 'and I heard the chair leg smash down through his skull.'" Hayward only admitted his involvement in Ging's murder, however, when it became clear that no reprieve was going to arrive from Minnesota Governor David Marston Clough.

According to Harold Schechter,

Throughout the confession, Harry does in fact display many of the traits that we now know are typical of serial murderers: overweening narcissism, juvenile sadism... pyromania, a total lack of empathy for other human beings. Like other serial killers, he would experience his 'murderous impulse' as a kind of autonomous 'second self that would suddenly 'come over him.' Interestingly, he also seems to have suffered from convulsions as an adolescent, possibly as a result of a head injury – a factor found in the background of many serial killers.

== Execution ==
At midnight on December 11, 1895, Hayward was visited by John Day Smith, who extracted from him a promise that he would publicly proclaim his faith in Jesus Christ from the scaffold. Moments later, Hayward was clothed in a black robe and cap and led to the gallows by Hennepin County Sheriff John Holmberg. As he ambled to the scaffold, Hayward cheerfully bade the spectators, "Good evening" and requested three cheers for himself. Upon being asked if he had any last words, Hayward gave a long and verbose speech and cracked so many jokes about his imminent death that one eyewitness later recalled that the spectators, "looked upon him almost as if he were a stage performer who would soon take his bow, receive his modicum of applause, and retire."

Eventually, Hayward kept his promise to Smith, "He is a religious man and I told him I would pledge him what he asked of me to say. I pledged it to him, although if I honestly believed it, I would say it, and satisfy myself, and it was this: 'Oh, God, for Christ's sake, forgive me for my sins.'"

Hayward also said of his brother Adry, "He has done me no wrong. I have done him a great injustice and wrong, and I have asked for his forgiveness and received it."

Hayward's, "flippant monologue," continued until Sheriff Holmberg cut in and ordered him to, "Die like a man."

Hayward's arms and legs were then pinioned and the noose was thrown around his neck. He sneered and quipped, "Keep up your courage boys!" His last words were "pull her tight; I'll stand pat." The gallows trap swung open at 2:12 AM, but the rope had been mis-measured and Hayward slowly strangled. He was pronounced dead at 2:25 AM.

Sheriff John Holmberg was paid $250 for his services.

== Burial ==
After being conveyed to the city morgue, Hayward's body was autopsied. His brain was removed and weighed in at 55 ounces. In accordance with the then-popular pseudoscience of phrenology, measurements were taken of Hayward's skull in accordance with the theories of Italian criminologist and physician Cesare Lombroso, who believed that criminals were a distinctive humanoid type. It was announced that Harry Hayward had possessed a "symmetry of skull, brain and face; the protrusion of the front teeth, and the narrow and arched palate". In conclusion, doctors ruled that Hayward was "a degenerate biological phenomenon somewhat below the savage and above the lunatic."

Following a funeral ceremony at Lakewood Cemetery, Harry T. Hayward was interred in a family plot at the Minneapolis Pioneers and Soldiers Memorial Cemetery.

== Serial killer? ==
In 2010, Minneapolis-based historian and true crime writer Jack El-Hai again brought the crimes of Harry Hayward to national attention. El-Hai had first learned of Hayward while writing an article for the 100th anniversary of the Kitty Ging murder in 1994. Deeply chilled by Hayward's cold-blooded nature, El-Hai continued his research on the case for decades. When Edward Goodsell's 1896 book about his cousin was digitized and put on Google Books, El-Hai read the transcript of Hayward's last interview for the first time and learned of his admission to 3 other unsolved murders.

In a February 2010 article for Minnesota Monthly, El-Hai argued that if Hayward's claims are proved to be true, then his crimes predate those of H. H. Holmes and are contemporary with those of Jack the Ripper. El-Hai expressed hope that Hayward's other alleged victims would rise from obscurity, as no other justice for them is now possible. He argued that, if this ever happened, Harry Hayward would be proven to have been America's first serial killer.

True crime author and historian Harold Schechter has written, "In the end, it is impossible to know whether Harry Hayward killed one victim or (as he claimed) four. All that can be said with certainty is that, as a case of criminal psychopathology – 'moral insanity,' in the terms of his contemporaries – Harry Hayward was, as Goodsell and others saw it, one of the most remarkable specimens of his age."

== Conspiracy theory ==
According to Walter Trenerry, rumors soon spread that Hayward had been secretly resurrected by a secret society. When researching the Ging murder during the early 1960s, Trenerry heard claims that the Freemasons' Grand Lodge of Minnesota had resurrected him. Trenerry, however, expressed skepticism that Hayward could have survived both hanging and dissection.

== Ballad ==
The murder ballad The Fatal Ride, which describes Hayward's involvement in the Kittie Ging murder, was written in 1895 by Joseph Vincent Brookes, a songwriter and "tragic poet" from Brainerd, Minnesota. When Brookes published the song, however, he used the pseudonym "Marius", possibly to hide the fact that he had borrowed the tune from the 1893 song The Fatal Wedding, by Gussie Davis.

== See also ==
- List of serial killers in the United States
