= Chaska (Dakota) =

We-Chank-Wash-ta-don-pee (Dakota: Wičháhpi Waštédaŋpi, Good Little Stars), or more commonly Chaska (pronounced chas-KAY) (died December 26, 1862) was a Native American of the Dakota who was executed in a mass hanging near Mankato, Minnesota, in the wake of the Dakota War of 1862, despite the fact that President Abraham Lincoln had commuted his death sentence days earlier.

== Background ==
In the years before the Civil War, relations between the Dakota people and white settlers had deteriorated considerably. Once the War began, already scarce resources were further strained, and the supplies promised to the Dakota in "a series of broken peace treaties" were no longer available. Starving tribesmen attacked settlements in Minnesota, and in response, more than 400 Dakota and "mixed-blood" men were detained by Brigadier General Henry Hastings Sibley. 303 of these men were sentenced to death, but Lincoln reversed all but 38 of the death sentences for lack of evidence. Chaska's sentence was one of those commuted, but (because of an apparent case of mistaken identity) he was nevertheless executed.

There has been some dispute over whether mistaken identity was to blame for Chaska's execution. There were three men held in Mankato on the day of the hanging called Chaska, which in the Dakota language means "junior" and is often used for a firstborn son. University of Oklahoma history professor and Little Crow biographer Gary Anderson believes soldiers "just grabbed the wrong guy". According to The New York Times, "We-Chank-Wash-ta-don-pee's case was No. 3 and not listed in the execution order handwritten by Lincoln... The man he died for was No. 121, identified by Lincoln as Chaskey-don or Chaskey-etay, who had been condemned for murdering a pregnant woman."

Others believe the execution was deliberate. During the war, Chaska had abducted a white woman, Sarah F. Wakefield, and her children. According to Wakefield, Chaska "kept them from certain death and abuse at the hands of his fellow tribesmen. 'If it had not been for Chaska,' Wakefield said, 'my bones would now be bleaching on the prairie, and my children with Little Crow.'" For her part, Wakefield "firmly believed that Chaska was executed on purpose, in retaliation for her testimony and in reaction to rumors that she and Chaska were lovers. General Sibley, who appointed the tribunal that convicted Chaska, privately referred to him as Wakefield's 'dusky paramour.'"

== Calls for a pardon ==
A move has begun to award Chaska a posthumous pardon. According to the New York Times, the idea of a pardon has received a mixed (though largely positive) response from the Dakota community:

Wayne Wells, a Dakota language teacher on the nearby Prairie Island reservation, said there would be a range of response to a pardon just for Chaska. Many Dakota, he said, 'consider all of them to be innocent martyrs — people who stood up and died for us.'

However, Leonard Wabasha, a local Dakota leader, said a federal pardon for Chaska would 'shine a light.'

'It would cause people to read and research into it a little deeper,' Mr. Wabasha said. 'It would be a step in the right direction.'

Former Minnesota Congressman James L. Oberstar said a pardon would be "a grand gesture and one I think our Congressional delegation should support," adding that "A wrong should be righted." Former Minnesota Senator Al Franken, who sat on the Committee on Indian Affairs, also signalled support for a pardon.

== In popular culture ==
Chaska is a major character in the historical novel Blood Moon: A Captive's Tale (2017) by Ruth Hull Chatlien, which is based on Sarah Wakefield's memoir about her captivity during the war.

Chadwick Stokes released a song in 2019 titled "Chaska" detailing the events.
