= William Williams (murderer) =

Cornish miner and murderer

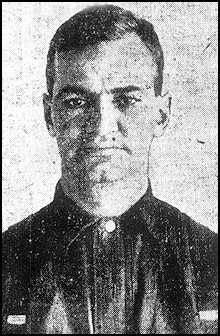
- Williams in 1905
- Born: c. 1877; St Ives, Cornwall, England, UK
- Died: 13 February 1906 (aged 28–29); Ramsey County Jail, Saint Paul, Minnesota, United States
- Cause of death: Botched execution by hanging (unintentional strangulation)
- Occupation: Miner
- Known for: Last person executed by the state of Minnesota
- Status: Executed
- Conviction: First degree murder
- Penalty: Death

William Williams (c. 1877 – 13 February 1906) was a Cornish miner and the last person executed by the state of Minnesota in the United States. Williams was convicted for the 1905 murders of 16-year-old John Keller and his mother, Mary Keller in Saint Paul, and his subsequent botched execution led to increased support for the abolition of capital punishment in Minnesota in 1911.

== Background ==
William Williams was born in 1877 and was an immigrant from Cornwall working as a miner in Saint Paul. In June 1903, while hospitalized for diphtheria, Williams befriended local teenager John Keller, who was recovering from the same disease. Over the next two years they lived together in Saint Paul and took two trips to the city of Winnipeg, Canada. Keller's father did not approve of the relationship and told his son that he was no longer permitted to travel with Williams and Keller returned to his parents' home in Saint Paul.

During 1905, Williams sent Keller a number of letters expressing love for him and requesting that Keller join him in Winnipeg. The letters contained threats if Keller did not comply, Williams wrote:

"I want you to believe that I love you now as much as I ever did, it won't be long before we will be together."

"Keep your promise to me this time, old boy, as it is your last chance. You understand what I mean and should have sense enough to keep your promise."

These letters, at the insistence of Mr. and Mrs. Keller, were unanswered. Williams returned to Saint Paul in April 1905, and on April 12, in a fit of rage, shot Keller and Keller's mother in their home. Keller was killed instantly when he was shot in the back of the head whilst he was in bed; his mother died from a gunshot wound a week later. Keller's father was not home at the time of the shooting.

== Trial ==
Williams was arrested and tried for premeditated murder, though he pleaded not guilty by reason of "emotional insanity." A police officer testified at court that Williams came to the station on the night of the murder, saying that he had shot someone, giving the address as "1 Reid Court". The testimony of a doctor, who looked at Williams, was that "he did not know why he shot Johnny Keller, only that he wanted the boy to come with him." When Williams took the stand, he told the court he didn't sleep for three nights prior to the murder and had been drinking heavily on the day of the shooting.

His defense was rejected and on 19 May 1905, he was convicted of murder. Ramsey County Attorney, Thomas Kane, excluded the jurors because of their opinion against the death penalty and Williams was sentenced to death by hanging. On 8 December 1905, the Minnesota Supreme Court affirmed his conviction and sentence although one judge dissented in the judgement, arguing that Williams's crime bore signs of a crime of passion and might have not been premeditated.

== Execution ==
On 13 February 1906, Williams was executed in the basement of the Ramsey County Jail in Saint Paul. There were 32 witnesses present during the execution, including Daily News reporter Joseph Hennessey, who entered the jail with the crowd, even though reporters were forbidden to attend. Before execution, Williams spoke from the gallows and insisted his innocence:

"Gentlemen, you are witnessing an illegal hanging. This is a legal murder. I am accused of killing Johnny Keller. He was the best friend I ever had and I hope I meet him in the other world. I never had improper relations with him. I am resigned to my fate. Goodbye."

=== Botched execution and death penalty abolition ===
After Williams dropped through the trap door, the rope used to hang him proved to be too long as Ramsey County Sheriff Anton Miesen had miscalculated its length, and Williams's neck stretched as well, causing his feet to make contact with the floor below the gallows. Three deputy sheriffs working for Ramsey County took turns hoisting the hanging rope upward so Williams would be suspended in the air, causing him to slowly strangle to death. Williams took over 14 minutes to die. After the execution, Williams's attorney called his hanging "a disgrace to civilization," and several newspapers compared hanging as a method of execution to torture methods during the Inquisition. Later, three Minnesota newspapers were fined $25 each for violating a gag law prohibiting the publication of any particulars about executions because they reported in detail about how Williams's execution transpired.

Following Williams's execution, the public sympathized with Williams's story, with many purportedly finding the elements of "love and heartbreak" to be "relatable," and members of the public began to view the death penalty as a cruel and inefficient punishment that did not deter crime. Also following Williams's execution, Governor John Albert Johnson held a meeting with Sheriff Miesen to understand what went wrong with Williams's execution. Afterwards, he commuted several active Minnesota death sentences to life imprisonment, and his successor, Adolph Olson Eberhart, commuted the remaining death sentences; Johnson specifically called the death penalty "[a] survival of the relic of the past." In 1911, State Representative George MacKenzie authored a bill to abolish the death penalty; on 22 April 1911, Governor Eberhart signed it into law, thereby abolishing capital punishment in the state. Williams was the last person to be executed in Minnesota's history; no executions have taken place in Minnesota since his hanging in 1906.

== See also ==
- List of most recent executions by jurisdiction
- List of botched executions

== Bibliography ==
- John D. Bessler (2003). Legacy of Violence: Lynch Mobs and Executions in Minnesota (St. Paul: University of Minnesota Press) ISBN 0-8166-3810-1
- "Botched hanging led state to halt executions", Star Tribune, 2008-02-12
- D. J. Tice (2001). "The Last Hangings: The Gottschalk and Williams Murder Cases, 1905", Minnesota's Twentieth Century: Stories of Extraordinary Everyday People (St. Paul: University of Minnesota Press) ISBN 0-8166-3429-7
- Walter N. Trenerry (1962). Murder in Minnesota: A Collection of True Cases (St. Paul: Minnesota Historical Society Press) ISBN 0-87351-180-8
