= Red Iron (Ma-za-sha) =

Dakota leader

- Ma-za-sha
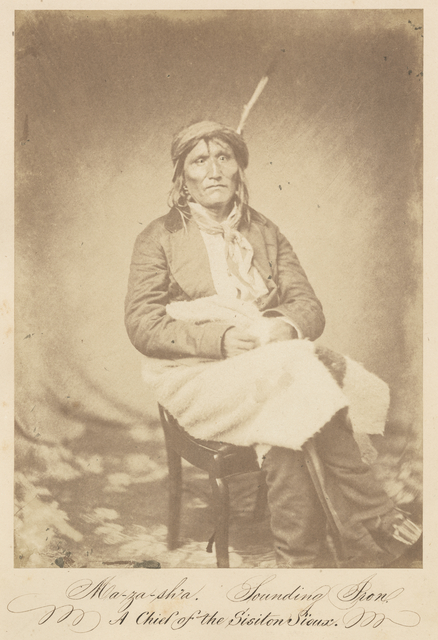
- Red Iron c. 1860 by Joel Emmons Whitney
- Born: c. 1811; Michigan Territory, U.S.
- Died: 1884; Lake Traverse Indian Reservation, Sisseton, South Dakota, U.S.
- Known for: Signatory of the Treaty of Traverse des Sioux and the Treaty with the Sioux, 1858
- Predecessor: Big Walker (Tankamani)

Red Iron (Dakota: Ma-za-sha) was a Dakota chief of the Wahpteon band of the Dakota. Red Iron was a signatory of the Treaty with the Sioux, 1858 and was a significant figure behind the Surrender at Camp Release during the Dakota War of 1862.

== Early life and treaties ==
Red Iron was born around 1811, he succeeded Tankamani (Big Walker) as the chief and primary leader of the Wahpeton Dakota at Traverse des Sioux. Red Iron was the supposed brother of Mazomani (Red Walker/ Iron Walker).

Due to his prominence amongst the Wahpeton, Red Iron was chosen as a signatory of the Treaty of Traverse des Sioux on July 23, 1851 and the Treaty with the Sioux (Dakota) on June 19, 1858. Red Iron later opposed the terms of the Treaty of Traverse des Sioux in 1852 which led to an altercation with Governor of Minnesota Alexander Ramsey. In 1852 when Red Iron opposed the terms of the treaty with Ramsey he was arrested by Minnesota authorities and stripped of his authority over the Wahpeton.

Although originally opposed to the terms of the treaties, Red Iron was progressive towards the idea of western culture and customs, choosing to live in a log cabin and relying on subsistence farming. Red Iron was heavily opposed to the consumption of alcohol following an incident of drunkenness which made him feel "disgusted with himself and the liquor business".

== The Dakota War and Camp Release ==
During the Dakota War of 1862 Red Iron is noted as being a "friendly Dakota" who opposed Thaóyate Dúta and his uprising. During the uprising Red Iron, Wabasha III, John Other Day, Gabriel Renville, and Chief Taopi created a camp of friendly Dakota near the mouth of the Chippewa River which acted as a safe haven for White and half breed Dakota refugees fleeing the ongoing conflict, this area would become known as Camp Release. Upon Brigadier General Henry Hastings Sibley's arrival to Camp Release Red Iron greeted Sibley and immediately arranged for the release of all refugees into Sibley's custody, these included 107 Whites and 162 Métis (sometimes referred to as "mixed-bloods").

== Later life ==
Following Camp Release Red Iron and many of the Dakota were deported to Dakota Territory and relocated to live on Indian reservations including the Lake Traverse Indian Reservation where Red Iron later died in 1884.

== Legacy ==
Red Iron Lake Township and Red Iron Lake in Marshall County, South Dakota are both named in honor of Red Iron.
