= John Other Day =

Dakota mediator

- Anpetutokeca
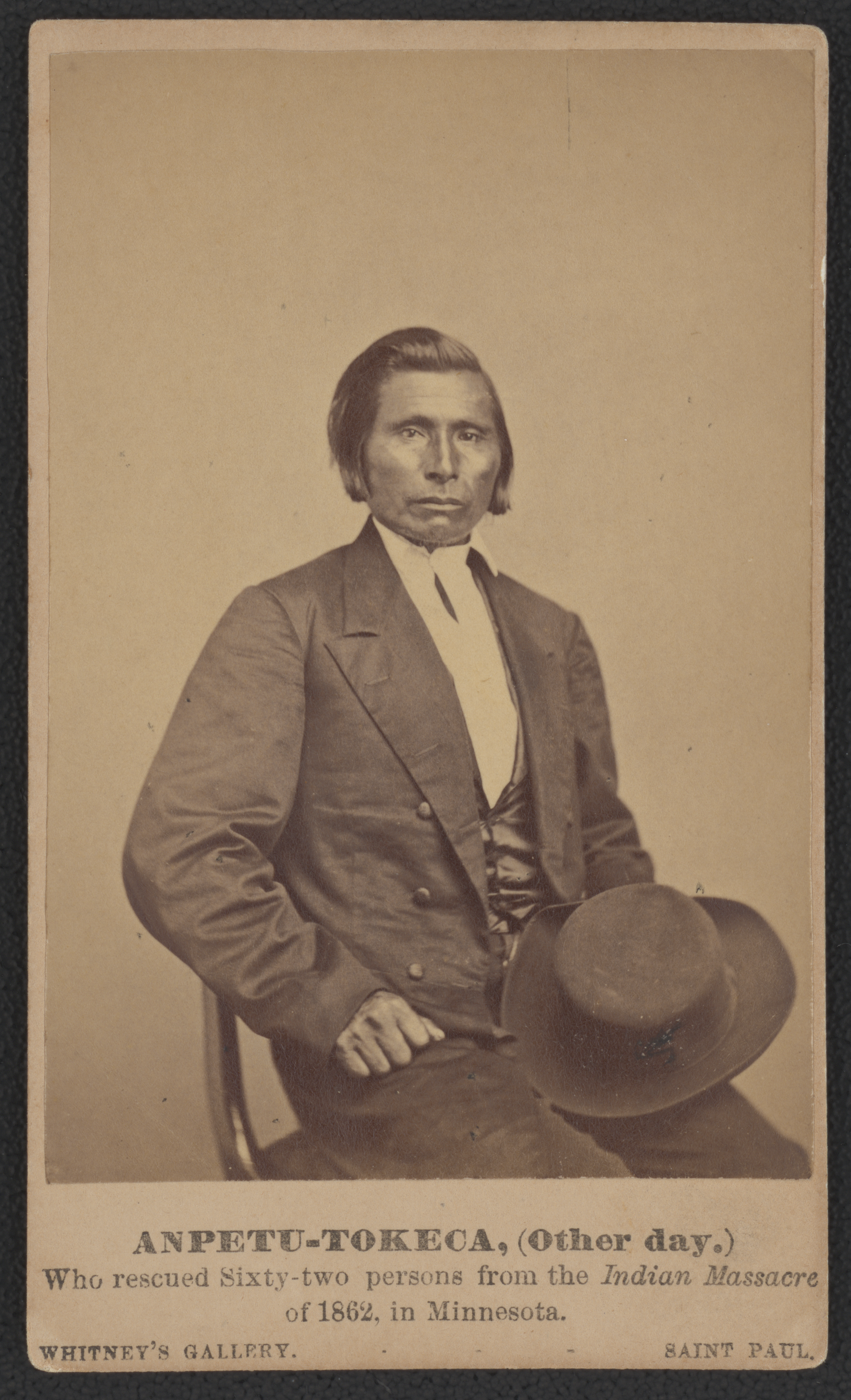
- Other Day c. 1862 by Joel Emmons Whitney
- Born: c. 1819; Swan Lake, Michigan Territory, (now in Nicollet County, Minnesota), U.S.
- Died: October 30, 1869; Fort Wadsworth, Dakota Territory, U.S.
- Known for: Rescuing and protecting 62 refugees during the Dakota War of 1862

John Other Day (c. 1819 – October 30, 1869), also known as Anpetutokeca, was a Dakota leader from Minnesota, a signatory of the Treaty of Traverse des Sioux, and an Indian Scout for the United States Army. Other Day was also a mediator who sought peace between the Dakota and European-American settlers during the Dakota War of 1862 where he fought for the U.S. Government at the Battle of Wood Lake and was a critical figure behind the Surrender at Camp Release.

== Early life ==
Born as Anpetutokeca (English: Good Sounding Voice) in 1819 near Swan Lake, Other Day was originally a formidable Dakota warrior as a young man but later anglicized his name to "John Other Day" (also spelled Otherday) and adopted western forms of life and converted to Christianity. Other Day was the leader of a migratory Wahpeton band of Dakota living between McLeod County, Minnesota and Nicollet County. Other Day was later a witness and signatory of the historic Treaty of Traverse des Sioux in 1851 and later the Treaty with the Sioux in 1858.

During Other Day's trip to Washington, D.C. as part of the 1858 Dakota delegation he engaged in drunkenness and married a saloon owner named Roxana. Other Day later swore off alcohol and

Other Day was later relocated along with his family the rest of the Dakota to the Upper Sioux Indian Reservation along the Minnesota River in the 1850s following the two treaties.

Other Day took part in the government rescue of Abbie Gardner-Sharp, a captive whose family was killed by Inkpaduta during the Spirit Lake Massacre in 1857.

== Role in the Dakota War ==
At the outbreak of the Dakota War of 1862, Other Day was a staunch opposer of Thaóyate Dúta and rebelling against the United States Government. Other Day's home and crops were later destroyed by the Dakota for being a "cut-hair" or "breeches Indian", a Dakota who westernized themselves. Other Day is best known for guiding 62 European-Americans 150 miles through Native American territory to the safety of Camp Release, a friendly Dakota camp created by Gabriel Renville, Chief Red Iron, Wabasha III, and others which harbored refugees escaping the conflict. Other Day later served as an Indian Scout for the forces commanded by General Henry H. Sibley at the Battle of Wood Lake.

== Later life ==
The United States Congress recognized Other Day for his services by paying him $2,500 for his efforts. Other Day used his proceeds to purchase a farm in Henderson, Minnesota. In 1867 the Lake Traverse Indian Reservation was created in order to relocate the Sisseton Wahpeton Oyate to the Dakota Territory and out of Minnesota, the reservation was made exclusively for the Sisseton and Wahpeton who had assisted the United States Government during the Dakota War.

John Other Day died at Fort Wadsworth, now Fort Sisseton, in Dakota Territory on October 30, 1869. He was initially buried at the Strum Farm in Roberts County, South Dakota, but was later reinterned at the Ascension (Iyaktapi) Presbyterian Cemetery in Spring Grove Township in Roberts County.

== Legacy ==
John Other Day is remembered in Minnesota history as a mediator during a troubling time in the state's history. Two major monuments were erected in honor of Other Day in Minnesota, one in Morton, Minnesota, the "John Other Day Marker", and one in Henderson, Minnesota, the "Faithful Indians' Monument". Various portraits and works of art of Other Day were taken by Joel Emmons Whitney, Martin Mason Hazeltine, and Henry H. Cross, among others and are held at both the Minnesota Historical Society and the Library of Congress.
