= List of artwork at the Minnesota State Capitol =

A comprehensive but not complete list of artworks at the Minnesota State Capitol.

Type	Image	Date Completed	Name/ Representation	Artist	Date Placed	Location
Sculpture	L’Étoile du Nord Reverse side of L’Étoile du Nord	1904	L'Étoile du Nord	Cass Gilbert (Designer)	1904	Rotunda and Senate Hearing Room
Sculpture	Marble Angel keystone	Unknown	Marble angel keystone	Unknown	Unknown	South Entrance (Exterior)
Sculpture	Marble Relief of Train	Unknown	Marble relief of train	Unknown	Unknown	North Entrance (Exterior)
Sculpture	Marble Angel keystone	Unknown	Marble relief of ship	Unknown	Unknown	North Entrance (Exterior)
Mural	Contemplative Spirit of the East	1904	Contemplative Spirit of the East	Kenyon Cox	1904	East Grand Staircase
Mural		1904	Livestock farming/winnowing lunette	Arthur Willett (Artist); Elmer Garnsey (Design)	1904	East Grand Staircase
Mural		1904	Commerce lunette	Arthur Willett (Artist); Elmer Garnsey (Design)	1904	East Grand Staircase
Mural		1904	Stonecutting lunette	Arthur Willett (Artist); Elmer Garnsey (Design)	1904	East Grand Staircase
Mural		1904	Milling lunette	Arthur Willett (Artist); Elmer Garnsey (Design)	1904	East Grand Staircase
Mural		1904	Mining lunette	Arthur Willett (Artist); Elmer Garnsey (Design)	1904	East Grand Staircase
Mural		1904	Shipping/navigation lunette	Arthur Willett (Artist); Elmer Garnsey (Design)	1904	East Grand Staircase
Mural		1904	Courage	Arthur Willett (Artist); Elmer Garnsey (Design)	1904	Senate Chamber
Mural		1904	Equality	Arthur Willett (Artist); Elmer Garnsey (Design)	1904	Senate Chamber
Mural		1904	Justice	Arthur Willett (Artist); Elmer Garnsey (Design)	1904	Senate Chamber
Mural		1904	Freedom	Arthur Willett (Artist); Elmer Garnsey (Design)	1904	Senate Chamber
Mural		1905	Discoverers and Civilizers Led to the Source of the Mississippi	Edwin H. Blashfield	1905	Senate Chamber, North Wall
Mural		1905	Minnesota: Granary of the World	Edwin H. Blashfield	1905	Senate Chamber, South Wall
Mural		1903	The Sacred Flame (Yesterday, Today and Tomorrow)	Henry Oliver Walker	1905	West Grand Staircase
Mural		1904	Horticulture lunette	Arthur Willett (Artist); Elmer Garnsey (Design)	1904	West Grand Staircase
Mural		1904	Hunting/huntress lunette	Arthur Willett (Artist); Elmer Garnsey (Design)	1904	West Grand Staircase
Mural		1904	Logging lunette	Arthur Willett (Artist); Elmer Garnsey (Design)	1904	West Grand Staircase
Mural		1904	Fur trading/pioneer lunette	Arthur Willett (Artist); Elmer Garnsey (Design)	1904	West Grand Staircase
Mural		1904	Agriculture/sowing lunette	Arthur Willett (Artist); Elmer Garnsey (Design)	1904	West Grand Staircase
Mural		1904	Dairy farming lunette	Arthur Willett (Artist); Elmer Garnsey (Design)	1904	West Grand Staircase
Mural		1904	Summer	Elmer Garnsey (Design)	1904	3rd Floor South Corridor Ceiling
Mural		1904	Autumn	Elmer Garnsey (Design)	1904	3rd Floor West Corridor Ceiling
Mural		1904	Winter	Elmer Garnsey (Design)	1904	3rd Floor West Corridor Ceiling
Mural		1904	Spring	Elmer Garnsey (Design)	1904	3rd Floor West Corridor Ceiling
Mural		1904	Alexander Hamilton quote	Elmer Garnsey (Design)	1904	3rd Floor South Corridor
Mural		1904	Cushman K. Davis quote	Elmer Garnsey (Design)	1904	3rd Floor North Corridor
Mural		1904	Minnesota Flora	Elmer Garnsey (Design)	1904	House Retiring Room
Mural		1904	The Home of General Sibley	Unknown	1904	House Chamber West Corridor
Mural		1904	The First Church in St. Paul	Unknown	1904	House Chamber West Corridor
Mural		1904	The Round Tower Ft. Snelling	Unknown	1904	House Chamber West Corridor
Mural		1904	The Old Block House Ft. Snelling	Unknown	1904	House Chamber West Corridor
Mural		1904	The River Navigators	Unknown	1904	House Chamber East Corridor
Mural		1904	The Rugged Men of the Pine	Unknown	1904	House Chamber East Corridor
Mural		1904	Kittson the First Representative	Unknown	1904	House Chamber East Corridor
Mural		1904	The Famous Red River Carts	Unknown	1904	House Chamber East Corridor
Mural		1904	Zodiac lunette-Aquarius	Elmer Garnsey (Design)	1904	Dome
Mural		1904	Zodiac lunette-Capricorn	Elmer Garnsey (Design)	1904	Dome
Mural		1904	Zodiac lunette-Sagittarius	Elmer Garnsey (Design)	1904	Dome
Mural		1904	Zodiac lunette-Scorpio	Elmer Garnsey (Design)	1904	Dome
Mural		1904	Zodiac lunette-Libra	Elmer Garnsey (Design)	1904	Dome
Mural		1904	Zodiac lunette-Virgo	Elmer Garnsey (Design)	1904	Dome
Mural		1904	Zodiac lunette-Leo	Elmer Garnsey (Design)	1904	Dome
Mural		1904	Zodiac lunette-Cancer	Elmer Garnsey (Design)	1904	Dome
Mural		1904	Zodiac lunette-Gemini	Elmer Garnsey (Design)	1904	Dome
Mural		1904	Zodiac lunette-Taurus	Elmer Garnsey (Design)	1904	Dome
Mural		1904	Zodiac lunette-Aries	Elmer Garnsey (Design)	1904	Dome
Mural		1904	Zodiac lunette-Pisces	Elmer Garnsey (Design)	1904	Dome
Mural		1904	Civilization of the Northwest: The American Genius	Edward Simmons	1905	Rotunda, Southwest Corner
Mural		1904	Civilization of the Northwest: The American Genius	Edward Simmons	1905	Rotunda, Northwest Corner
Mural		1904	Civilization of the Northwest: The American Genius	Edward Simmons	1905	Rotunda, Northeast Corner
Mural		1904	Civilization of the Northwest: The American Genius	Edward Simmons	1906	Rotunda, Southeast Corner
Mural		1903	Moral and Divine Law	John La Farge	1905	Supreme Court Chamber, East Wall
Mural		1905	The Adjustment of Conflicting Interests	John La Farge	1906	Supreme Court Chamber, South Wall
Mural		1905	The Relation of the Individual to the State	John La Farge	1906	Supreme Court Chamber, West Wall
Mural		1905	Recording of Precedents	John La Farge	1906	Supreme Court Chamber, North Wall
Mural		1935	Old Fort Charlotte on the Pigeon River	State Emergency Relief Administration (SERA ) artist, Unknown	1935	B-22 (Former Governor's Dining)
Mural		1936	River fishing scene	Carl Olson	1936	B-27 (Former Justice's Dining Room)
Painting		1906	The Battle of Nashville	Howard Pyle	1906	Governor's Reception Room
Painting		1904	The Fourth Minnesota Entering Vicksburg	Francis David Millet	1906	Governor's Reception Room
Painting		1906	The Second Minnesota at Mission Ridge	Stephen A. Douglas Volk	1906	Governor's Reception Room
Painting		1906	The Battle of Gettysburg	Rufus F. Zogbaum	1907	Governor's Reception Room
Painting		1910	The Third Minnesota Entering Little Rock	Stanley M. Arthurs	1910	Governor's Ante Room
Painting		1912	The Fifth Minnesota at Corinth	Edwin H. Blashfield	1912	Governor's Ante Room
Painting		1905	Father Hennepin at St. Anthony Falls	Stephen A. Douglas Volk	1905	Originally Governor's Reception Room Moved to 3rd Floor Gallery
Painting		1905	Treaty of Traverse des Sioux	Francis Davis Millet	1905	Originally Governor's Reception Room Moved to 3rd Floor Gallery
Governor; Portrait		1917	Adolph Olson Eberhart	Arvid F. Nyholm	1944	1st Floor, East Dome Corridor
Governor; Portrait		1873	Alexander Ramsey	Carl Gutherz	1944	1st Floor, West Corridor
Governor; Portrait		1889	Andrew R. McGill	Carl Gutherz	1944	1st floor, West Stair Corridor North
Governor; Portrait		1882	Cushman K. Davis	Carl Gutherz	1944	1st floor, West Stair Corridor South
Governor; Portrait		1893	David M. Clough	Herbert G. Conner	1944	1st Floor, North Dome Corridor
Governor; Portrait		1939	Elmer Benson	Carl Bohnen	1944	1st Floor, East Corridor
Governor; Portrait		1936	Floyd B. Olson	Carl Bohnen	1944	1st Floor, East Corridor
Governor; Portrait		1943	Harold E. Stassen	Carl Bohnen	1944	1st Floor, East Corridor
Governor; Portrait		1871	Henry A. Swift	Unknown	1944	1st Floor, West Corridor
Governor; Portrait		c.1860	Henry Hastings Sibley	John P. Bligh	1944	1st Floor, West Corridor
Governor; Portrait		1937	Hjalmar Petersen	Carl Bohnen	1944	1st Floor, East Corridor
Governor; Portrait		1873	Horace Austin	Carl Gutherz	1944	1st Floor, West Stair Corridor South
Governor; Portrait		1927	Jacob A.O. Preus	Carl Bohnen	1944	1st Floor, East Stair Corridor
Governor; Portrait		1907	John A. Johnson	Nicholas Brewer	1944	1st Floor, East Dome Corridor
Governor; Portrait		1902	John Lind	Max Bohm	1944	1st Floor, North Dome Corridor
Governor; Portrait		1915	Winfield Hammond	Nicholas Brewer	1944	1st Floor, East Stair Corridor
Governor; Portrait		c.1947	Edward J. Thye	Theodore Sohner	1947	1st Floor, East Corridor
Governor; Portrait		c.1955	Clyde Elmer Anderson	Edward V. Brewer	1955	Ground Floor, West Dome Corridor
Governor; Portrait		c.1961	Orville L. Freeman	Elizabeth Mihalyi	1961	Ground Floor, West Dome Corridor
Governor; Portrait		c.1963	Elmer L. Anderson	Edward V. Brewer	1963	Ground Floor, North Dome Corridor
Governor; Portrait		1964	Luther W. Youngdahl	Louis A. Grendahl	1964	1st Floor, East Corridor
Governor; Portrait		1967	Karl F. Rolvaag	Frances Cranmer Greenman	1967	Ground Floor, North Dome Corridor
Governor; Portrait		1971	Harold Levander	Barbara Brewer Peet	1971	Ground Floor, North Dome Corridor
Governor; Portrait		1981	Wendell R. Anderson	Richard Lack	1982	Ground Floor, North Dome Corridor
Governor; Portrait		1985	Albert Quie	Richard Lack	1984	Ground Floor, East Dome Corridor
Governor; Portrait		1999	Arne Carlson	Stephen Gjertson	1999	Ground Floor, South Dome Corridor
Governor; Portrait		2000	Rudy Perpich	Mark Balma	2000	Ground Floor, East Dome Corridor
Governor; Portrait		2003	Jesse Ventura	Stephen Cepello (1949-)	2003	Ground Floor, South Dome Corridor
Governor; Portrait		2011	Tim Pawlenty	Rossin	2011	Ground Floor, S. Corridor, Great Hall
Portrait		1931	Abraham Lincoln	Edward V. Brewer	1932	House Chamber
Portrait		1988	Gordon Rosenmeier	Charles Caspner	1990	G17
Portrait		c.1890	Charles Gilman	Vera Clark Place	c.1920	223
Portrait		Unknown	George Washington	Unknown	c.1960	125
Portrait		1890	Joe Rolette	Unknown	c.1907	112
Portrait		1972	Gordon Rosenmeier	Jerome Ryan	Unknown	122
Statue		1905	Bounty (Virtue)	Daniel Chester French	1905	South Attic (Exterior)
Statue		1905	Courage (Virtue)	Daniel Chester French	1905	South Attic (Exterior)
Statue		1905	Integrity (Virtue)	Daniel Chester French	1905	South Attic (Exterior)
Statue		1905	Prudence (Virtue)	Daniel Chester French	1905	South Attic (Exterior)
Statue		1905	Truth (Virtue)	Daniel Chester French	1905	South Attic (Exterior)
Statue		1905	Wisdom (Virtue)	Daniel Chester French	1905	South Attic (Exterior)
Statue		1906	Progress of the State (Quadriga)	Daniel Chester French / Edward Potter	1906	South Drum Terrace (Exterior)
Statue		1909	William Colvill	Catherine Backus	1909	2nd Floor, Rotunda
Statue		1910	Alexander Wilkin	John Karl Daniels	1910	2nd Floor, Rotunda
Statue		1911	John Sanborn	John Karl Daniels	1911	2nd Floor, Rotunda
Statue		1914	James Shields	Fredrick C. Hibbard	1914	2nd Floor, Rotunda
Statue		1938	Minnesota Spirit of Government	Brioschi Studios	1938	House Chamber
Statue		1925	German Pioneers	Albert Jaegers	1959	1st Floor, North Entrance Vestibule
Bust		1906	Henry M. Rice	Luella Varney	1910	Senate Chamber
Bust		1895	Knute Nelson	Jacob Fjelde	1915	Senate Chamber
Bust		1925	Cass Gilbert	Edmond Thomas Quinn (1868-1929)	1926	1st Floor, West Dome Corridor
Bust		Unknown	William Windom	Unknown	1944	1st Floor, South Dome Corridor
Bust		1860	Henry Hastings Sibley	Henry Dexter	1974	1st Floor, North Dome Corridor
Bust		1901	Ignatius Donnelly	John Karl Daniels	1974	1st Floor, North Dome corridor
Bust		1891	William Watts Folwell	Jacob Fjelde	1974	1st Floor, North Dome Corridor
Bust		1977	Hubert H. Humphrey	George Norbert Bassett (1925-2023)	1977	1st Floor, West Grand Staircase
Bust		1983	Nicholas D. Coleman	Paul T. Granlund	1983	1st Floor, West Dome Corridor
Bust		1984	Warren Burger	Walker Hancock	1984	2nd Floor, Supreme Court Foyer
Bust		1985	Sigurd Olson	George Norbert Bassett (1925-2023)	1981	1st Floor, North Corridor
Bust		1985	Martin Luther King, Jr.	George Norbert Bassett (1925-2023)	1986	1st Floor, East Grand Staircase
Bust		1985	Wabasha III	JoAnne Bird (1945-)	1986	1st Floor, East Dome Corridor
Bust		1990	Edward Burdick	Paul T. Granlund	1990	House of Representatives Lobby
Bust		Unknown	Cushman Davis	I.G. Trentanove	Unknown	Senate Chamber
Bust		1906	William Washburn	Franklin Simmons	Unknown	Senate Chamber, SE corner
Bust		1926	Winfield Scott Hammond	Bryant Baker	Unknown	1st Floor, South Dome Corridor
Plaque		1907	Board of Capitol Commissioners	Cass Gilbert / G.A. Carsley (Designers)	1907	1st Floor, South Dome Corridor
Plaque		1907	Capitol dedication	Cass Gilbert / G.A. Carsley (Designers)	1907	1st Floor, South Dome Corridor
Plaque		1907	Capitol description	Cass Gilbert / G.A. Carsley (Designers)	1907	1st Floor, South Dome Corridor
Plaque		2019	Capitol restoration		2019	1st Floor, South Dome Corridor
Plaque		1907	34th Senate of the State of Minnesota	Cass Gilbert	1908	Senate Retiring Room
Plaque		1911	1st Minnesota Infantry Regiment	Catherine Backus/Fredrick C. Hibbard	1911	1st Floor, Rotunda
Plaque		Unknown	Clara Ueland	Louis Gross	1927	1st Floor, Rotunda
Plaque		1928	Alexander Ramsey	Cass Gilbert (Design)	1929	1st Floor, West Corridor
Plaque		1937	Floyd B. Olson	Charles Brioschi	1938	1st Floor, West Corridor
Plaque		1938	Martha Ripley	Charles S. Wells	1939	1st Floor, Rotunda
Plaque		1938	Old Northwest Territory	Unknown	c.1939	1st Floor, Rotunda
Plaque		1943-1948	13th Minnesota Infantry Regiment	Brioschi Studios	1948	1st Floor, Rotunda
Plaque		1964	Roscoe Pound	Unknown	c.1964	2nd Floor, East Corridor
Plaque		2002	Philippine-American War	Ann Klefstad	2002	1st Floor, Rotunda

== List of Removed Artwork ==
Type	Image	Date Completed	Name	Artist	Date Placed	Location	Date Removed	Reason
Mural		1904	Records	William Andrew MacKay (Artist); Elmer Garnsey (Design)	1904	House of Representatives Chamber	1938	(still in existence but covered)
Mural		1904	History	William Andrew MacKay (Artist); Elmer Garnsey (Design)	1904	House of Representatives Chamber	1938	(still in existence but covered)
Painting		1910	Battle of Ta-Ha-Kouty (Killdeer Mtn.)	Carl L. Boeckmann	1914	317	2016	Removed
Painting		1904	Attack on New Ulm	Anton Gag	c.1923	118	2016	Removed

== See also ==
- Minnesota State Capitol
- Minnesota State Capitol artwork
