= Red Iron =

Red Iron or Iron Red may refer to:

- Iron(III) oxide, a common red oxide of iron
- Red Iron, an iron oxide-based ceramic colorant
- Rust, rusted, or rusty iron
- Iron Ore, which may be Hematite (literally, blood-like stone), Taconite, or other types red-colored iron ore
- A common place, street, or business name in the Mesabi Range or similar iron ore mining region
- Structural steel, because it is often manufactured with no rust protection or with only a red oxide coating
- A business or service name for organizations that sell or install structural steel
- Red Iron (Ma-za-sha), a Sioux chief, signer of Treaty of Traverse des Sioux, and lifetime ambassador for peace who rescued hundreds of settlers taken captive in the Dakota War of 1862
  - Red Iron Lake, a lake group in South Dakota, named for the Sioux chief
- Red Iron! (1940 book), the story of a young civil engineer, set in the Depression, by Courtney Parmly Brown

Also:
