= Wabasha III =

Head chief of Santee Sioux

- Wapahaśa
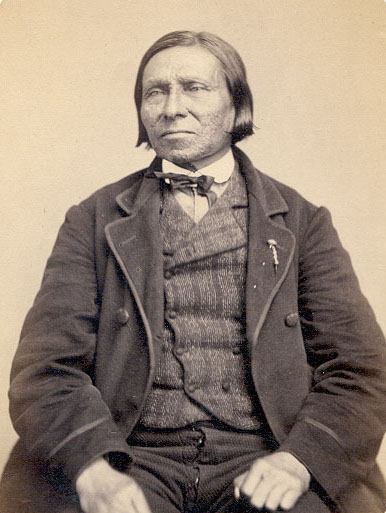
- Born: c. 1816; Michigan Territory, U.S.
- Died: April 23, 1876; Santee Sioux Reservation, Santee, Nebraska, U.S.
- Resting place: Holy Faith Cemetery, Santee, Nebraska, U.S.

Wabasha III (Wapahaśa) (c. 1816– April 23, 1876) was a prominent Dakota Sioux chief, also known as Joseph Wabasha. He succeeded his father as head chief of the Mdewakanton Dakota in 1836. Following the Dakota War of 1862 and the forced removal of the Dakota to Crow Creek Reservation, Wabasha became known as head chief of the Santee Sioux. In the final years of his life, Chief Wabasha helped his people rebuild their lives at the Santee Reservation in Nebraska.

In 1862, Wabasha had opposed the Dakota uprising from the start but had struggled to gain support. In the final weeks of the war, Wabasha — together with Wakute II and Taopi — sent messages to Colonel Henry Hastings Sibley voicing their opposition to Little Crow and offering their assistance to the U.S. Wabasha's son-in-law, Hdainyanka, was one of the 38 Dakota men executed in Mankato, Minnesota on December 26, 1862.

In 1986, a bust of Chief Wabasha III was installed at the Minnesota State Capitol.

== Succession as chief ==
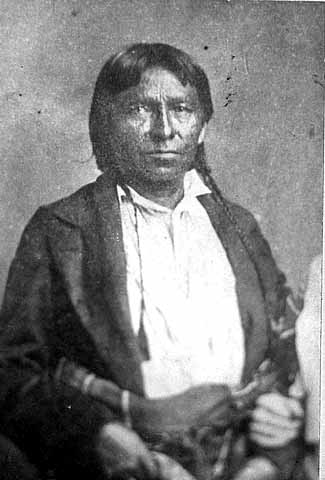
Wapasha, c. 1860.

Before succeeding his father in 1836, Chief Wabasha III was known as Tatepsin, which is translated as "Upsetting Wind" or "Bounding Wind."

Chief Wabasha II died during a smallpox epidemic that killed many in his Kiyuksa (Keoxa) band.

Around the time that Tatepsin became chief, the Kiyuksa band was twice as large as any other Mdewakanton band.The Kiyuksa band migrated periodically between the mouth of the upper Iowa River and Lake Pepin, and hunted on both sides of the upper Mississippi River.

Wabasha had extensive kinship ties to "mixed-blood" traders and settlers in the area. In 1842, Chief Wabasha III presuaded Indian agent Amos Bruce to employ his relative, James Reed.

== Treaties ==
On September 10, 1836, Tatepsin signed the fifth Treaty of Prairie du Chien with acting Indian agent Colonel Zachary Taylor. The treaty relinquished all Sioux claims to what is now northwest Missouri to the United States.

Chief Wabasha signed the Treaty of Traverse des Sioux in 1851 and the Treaty with the Sioux in 1858 that ceded the southern half of what is now the state of Minnesota to the United States. These land sales began the removal of his band to the Upper Sioux Indian Reservation and Lower Sioux Indian Reservation on the Minnesota River.

== Opposition to Dakota uprising ==
In 1862, Wabasha had opposed the Dakota uprising from the start but had struggled to gain support.

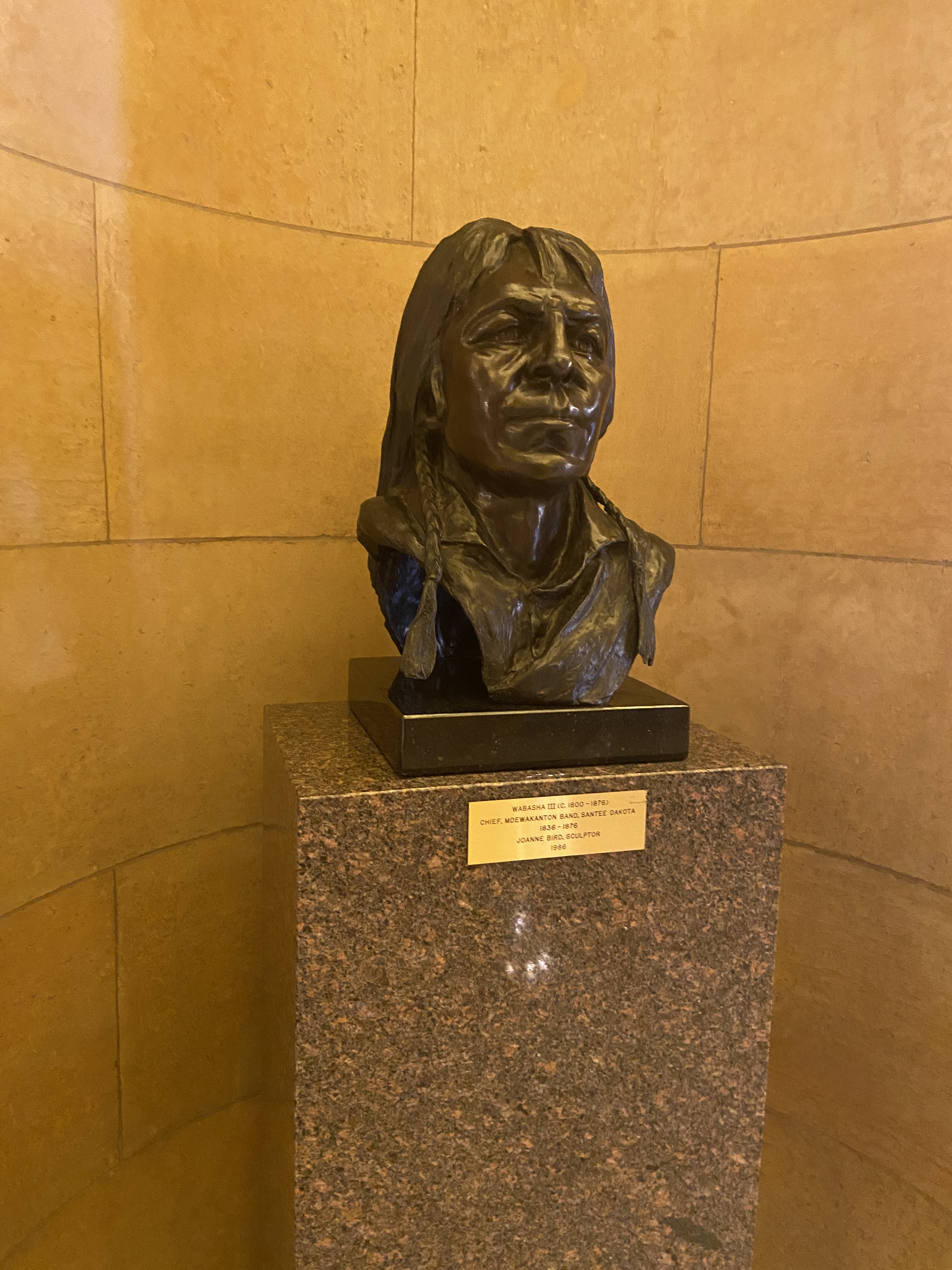
Bust of Chief Wabasha III in Minnesota State Capitol

== Removal to Crow Creek ==
Following the Dakota Uprising in 1862 the Dakota were removed from Minnesota to the Crow Creek Reservation in Dakota Territory.

== Santee Sioux Reservation ==
They then moved to the Santee Reservation in Nebraska, where chief Wabasha III died on April 23, 1876.
