= Joel Emmons Whitney =

American photographer

Joel Emmons Whitney Jr.
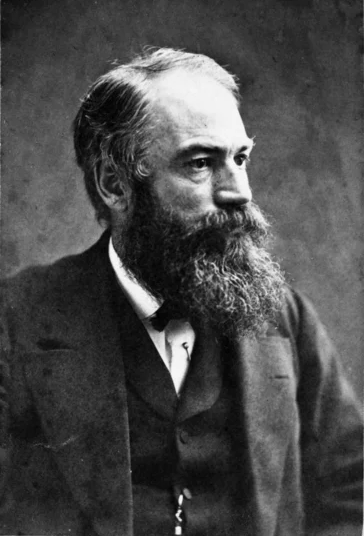
- Whitney c. 1875
- Born: May 18, 1822; Phillips, Maine, U.S.
- Died: January 20, 1886 (aged 63); Saint Paul, Minnesota, U.S.
- Resting place: Oakland Cemetery; Saint Paul, Minnesota, U.S.
- Known for: Photographing famous people of Minnesota
- Style: Tintype, ambrotype, daguerreotype, and carte de visite
- Movement: Early photography

Joel Emmons Whitney Jr. (May 18, 1822 – January 20, 1886) was an early American photographer known for tintype, ambrotype, carte de visite, and daguerreotype photographs. From 1851 to 1871, Whitney was the proprietor of a photograph gallery Saint Paul, Minnesota where he primarily produced carte de visit photographs and daguerreotypes, especially during the American Civil War.^{:45}

According to historian Bonnie G. Wilson of the Minnesota Historical Society, Whitney is regarded as the first professional photographer of Saint Paul.^{:45} Whitney was the first photographer in Saint Paul to adopt the collodion process and utilize albumen print.^{:45} Whitney is also noted for having produced the first lithograph map of the city of Saint Paul with the help of William Gates LeDuc.^{:1177}

== Early life ==
Whitney was born on May 18, 1822 in Phillips, Maine.^{:1177}^{:30} Whitney was the son of a merchant miller, Joel Whitney Sr., and Sallie Whitney (née Dyar).^{:1177} Whitney and his father moved to Saint Paul in Minnesota Territory in 1850.^{:30} At the time Whitney knew nothing about photography or daguerreotypes.^{:30} Whitney made the acquaintance of Alexander Hesler, a professional photographer with four years of experience in Galena, Illinois, who had recently traveled to Minnesota Territory to take photographs for Harper's Weekly.^{:45}^{:31} The two men eventually became inseparable business partners and friends.^{:31}

== Career ==
Whitney worked as Hesler's pupil and apprentice from 1850 to 1852, travelling through the Minnesota countryside near Minneapolis–Saint Paul and photographing a variety of people and places such as Minnehaha Falls.^{:31} Whitney eventually created his own photography studio in Saint Paul called "Whitney's Daguerrean Gallery".^{:31} Whitney's studio was situated above the storefront of Charles D. Elfelt at the corner of Third Street and Cedar Street in Saint Paul.^{:45}^{:31} For a brief time Whitney worked as a banker for the firm Caldwell, Whitney and Company.^{:1177} Whitney also owned substantial amounts of land in Saint Paul, including forty acres near the modern day Saint Paul Central High School and half of Merriam Park.^{:1177}

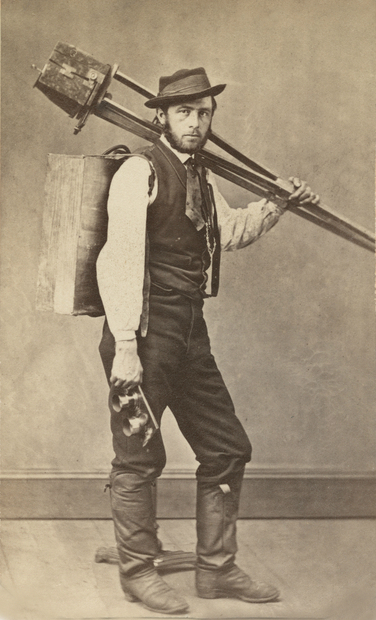
Charles Alfred Zimmerman, one of Whitney's apprentices and coworkers with a tripod and stereo lens c.1860

Whitney was the employer of Charles Alfred Zimmerman (1844–1909), a notable photographer of Saint Paul.^{:49} Whitney and Zimmerman had known each other since Zimmerman was a child.^{:49} Zimmerman was first employed as Whitney's apprentice before they formally partnered with one another in 1870.^{:16}

Whitney was a profound photographer of Native Americans in the United States.^{:45-46} Whitney was present during the 1858 Treaty with the Sioux. Following the Dakota War of 1862 there was a great demand in Minnesota and the United States for photographs of various Indigenous Peoples from the Midwest who had participated in the conflict.^{:13} Whitney fulfilled this by taking massive amounts of photographs of various Indigenous people including Little Crow, Hole in the Day, John Other Day, Gabriel Renville, Old Betz, and Shakopee III, among many others.^{:46} Following the death of Little Crow in 1863, Little Crow's scalp was brought to Whitney and photographed.^{:67}

During his career from 1851 to 1871, Whitney is credited with photographing many prominent figures of early Minnesota history as well including Alexander Ramsey, Jane Swisshelm, Joseph R. Brown Henry Hastings Sibley, Willis A. Gorman, Henry M. Rice, Edward Duffield Neill, and Morton S. Wilkinson, among many others.^{:46}

== Later life and death ==
In 1871 Whitney sold his studio to Zimmerman due to his health.^{:47}^{:16} As Whitney's pupil and successor, Zimmerman went on to become a notable photographer in Saint Paul history.^{:49}^{:16} Whitney moved to Atlanta, Georgia in 1871 and Tennessee in 1873 before moving back to Saint Paul in 1880.^{:1177} Whitney died in Saint Paul on January 20, 1886.^{:47}^{:1177} Whitney is buried in Oakland Cemetery in Saint Paul.^{:1177}

== Personal life ==
Whitney was married to Elsie Ayer on October 6, 1865, together they had two daughters.^{:1177}

== Legacy ==
Many of Whitney's tintypes, carte de visite, and daguerreotypes are part of the collections of the Minnesota Historical Society, the Library of Congress, and the National Portrait Gallery, among others.

== Gallery ==
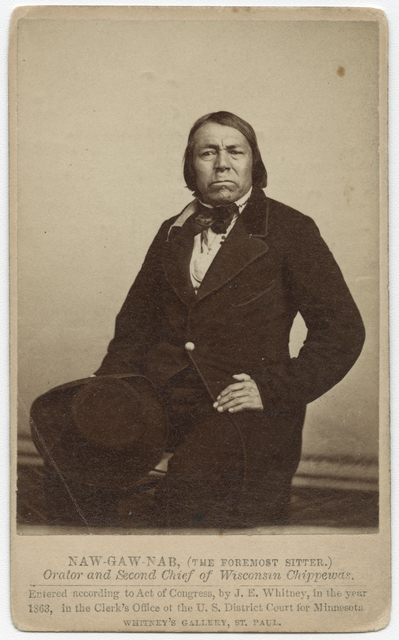
Fond-du-Lac Chief Naw-gaw-nab

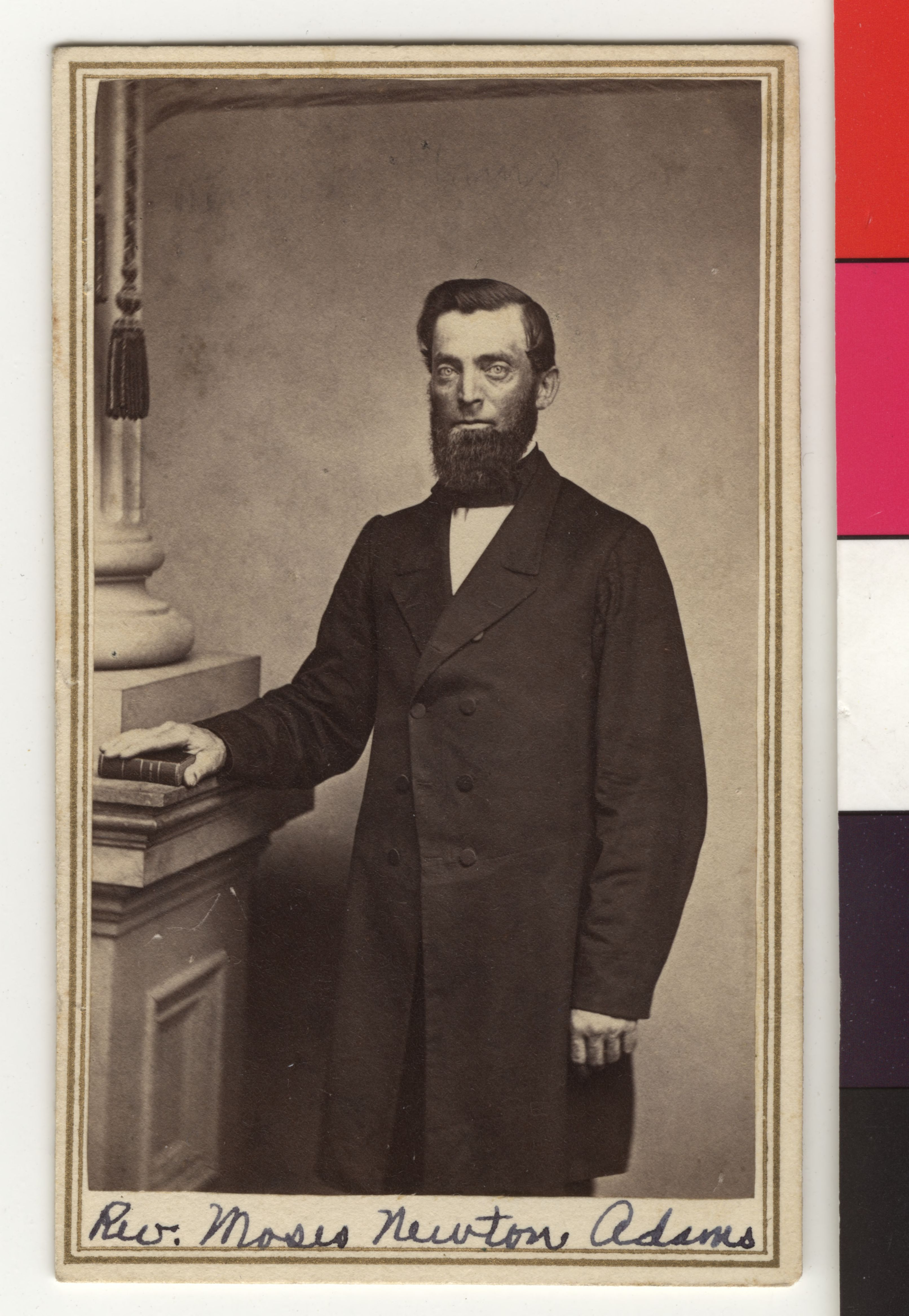
Indian Agent Rev. Moses N. Adams

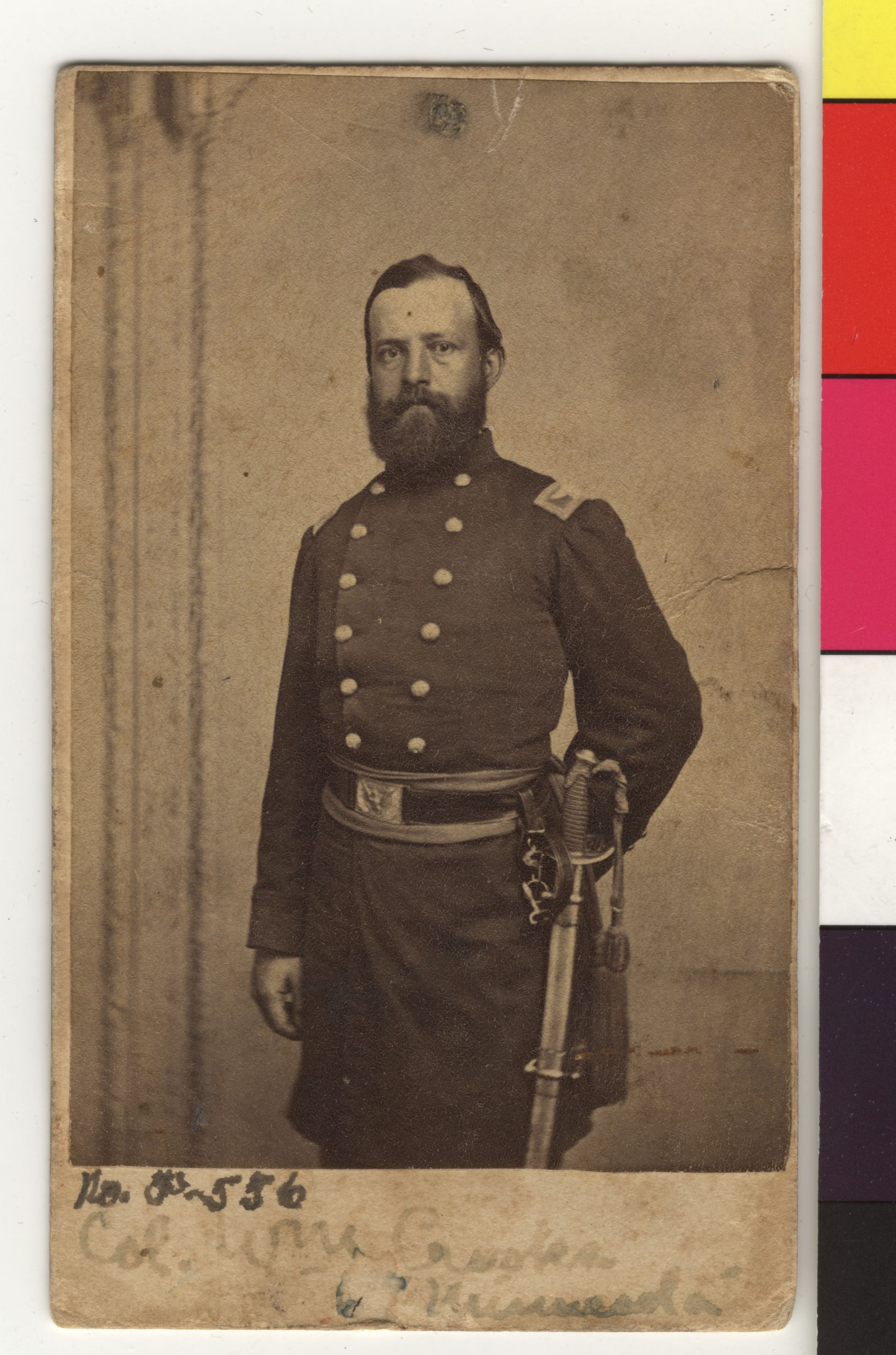
Colonel William Crooks of hte 6th Minnesota Infantry Regiment

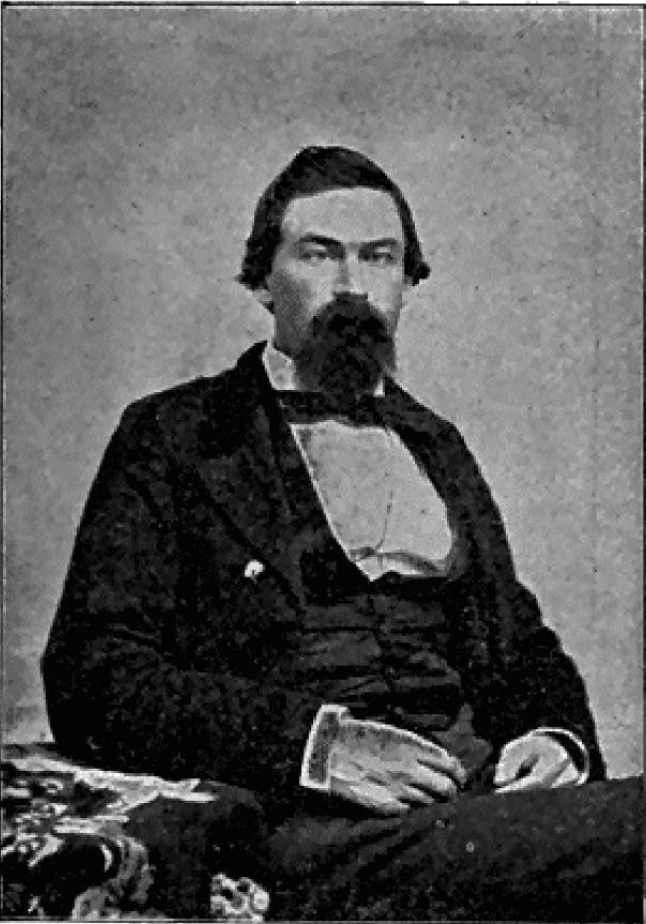
George H. Spencer Jr., one of the hostages taken during the Attack at the Lower Sioux Agency

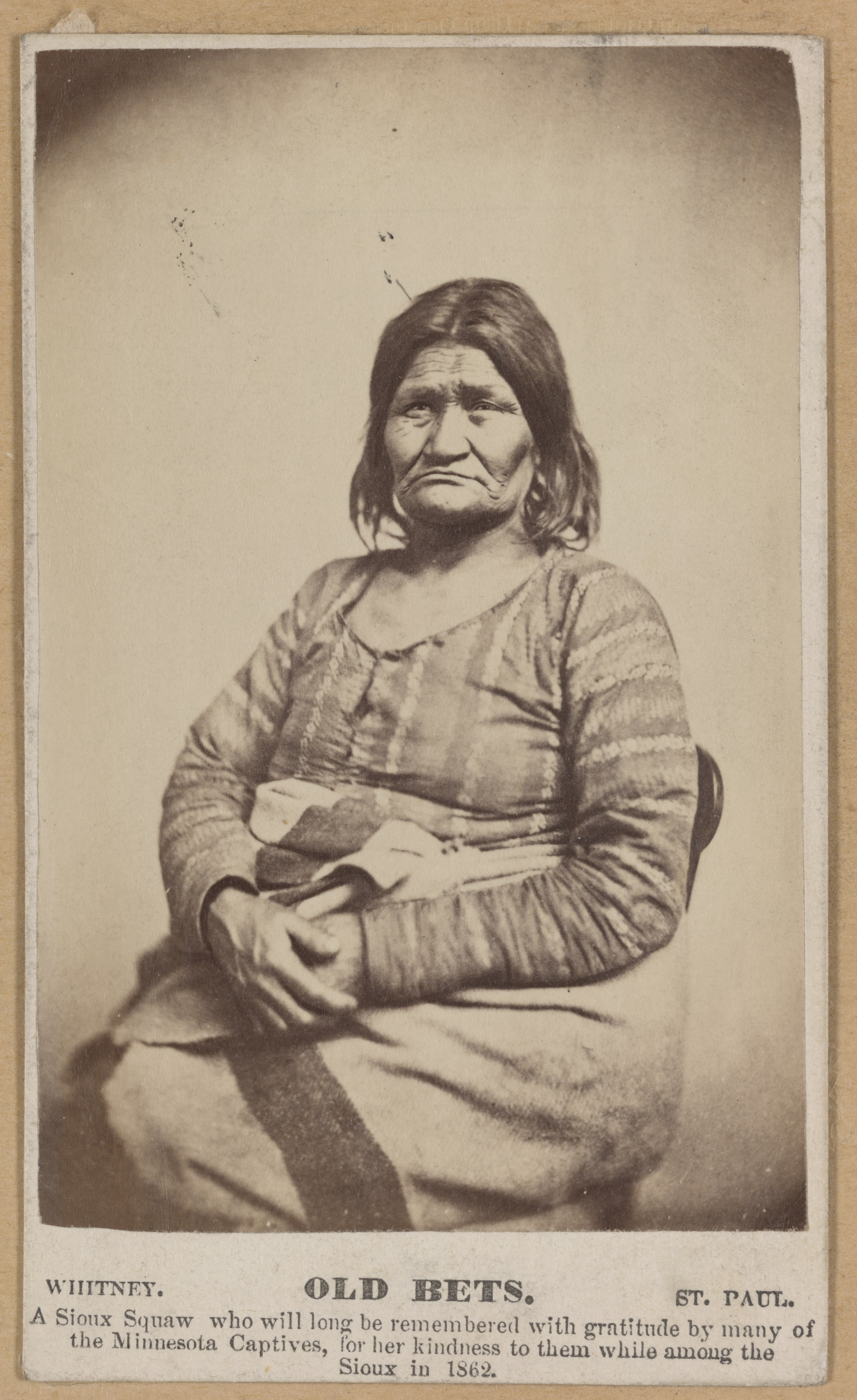
Azayamankawin or "Old Bets", a Mdewakanton Dakota woman well known in Saint Paul, Minnesota.

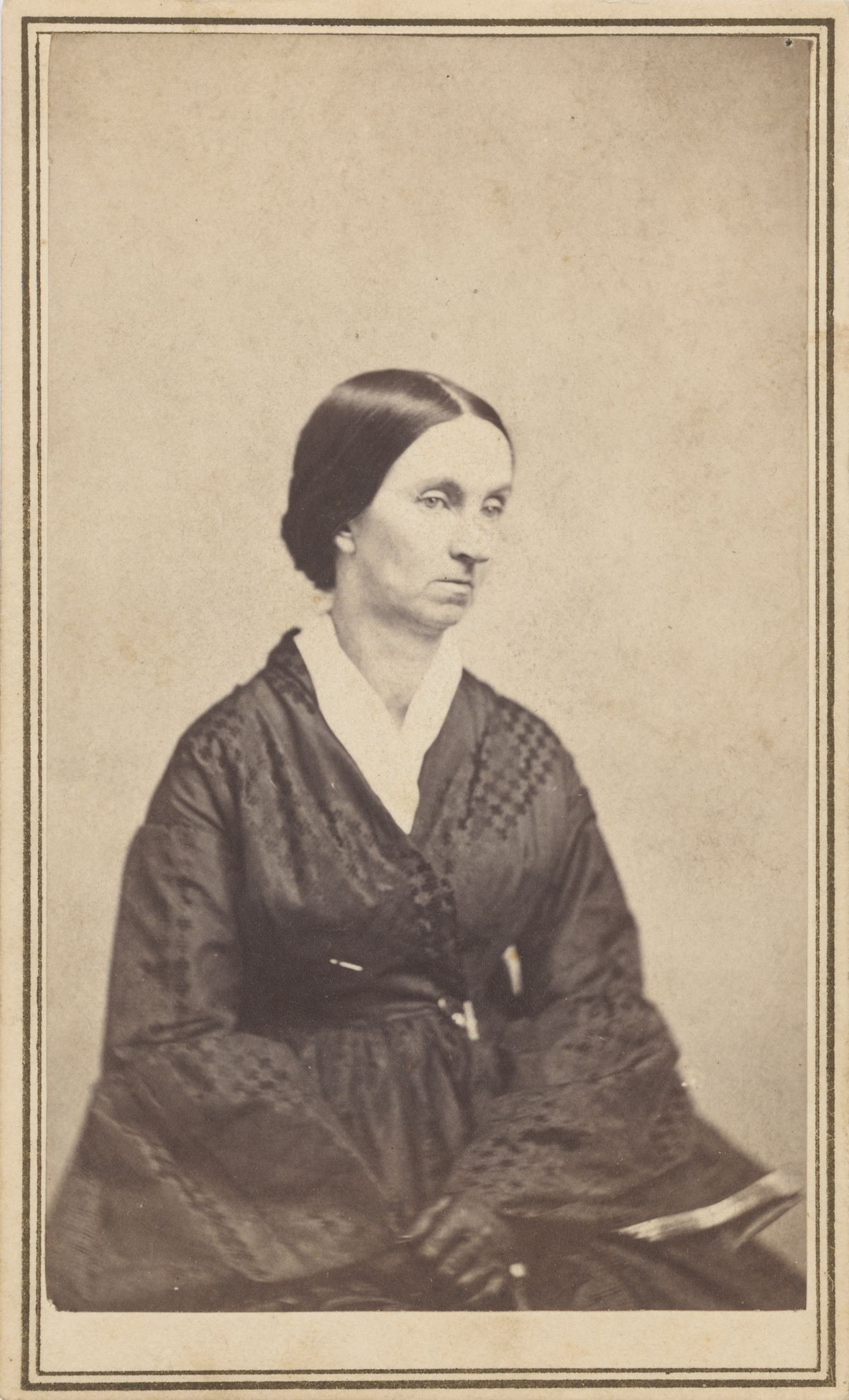
Jane Swisshelm c.1865.

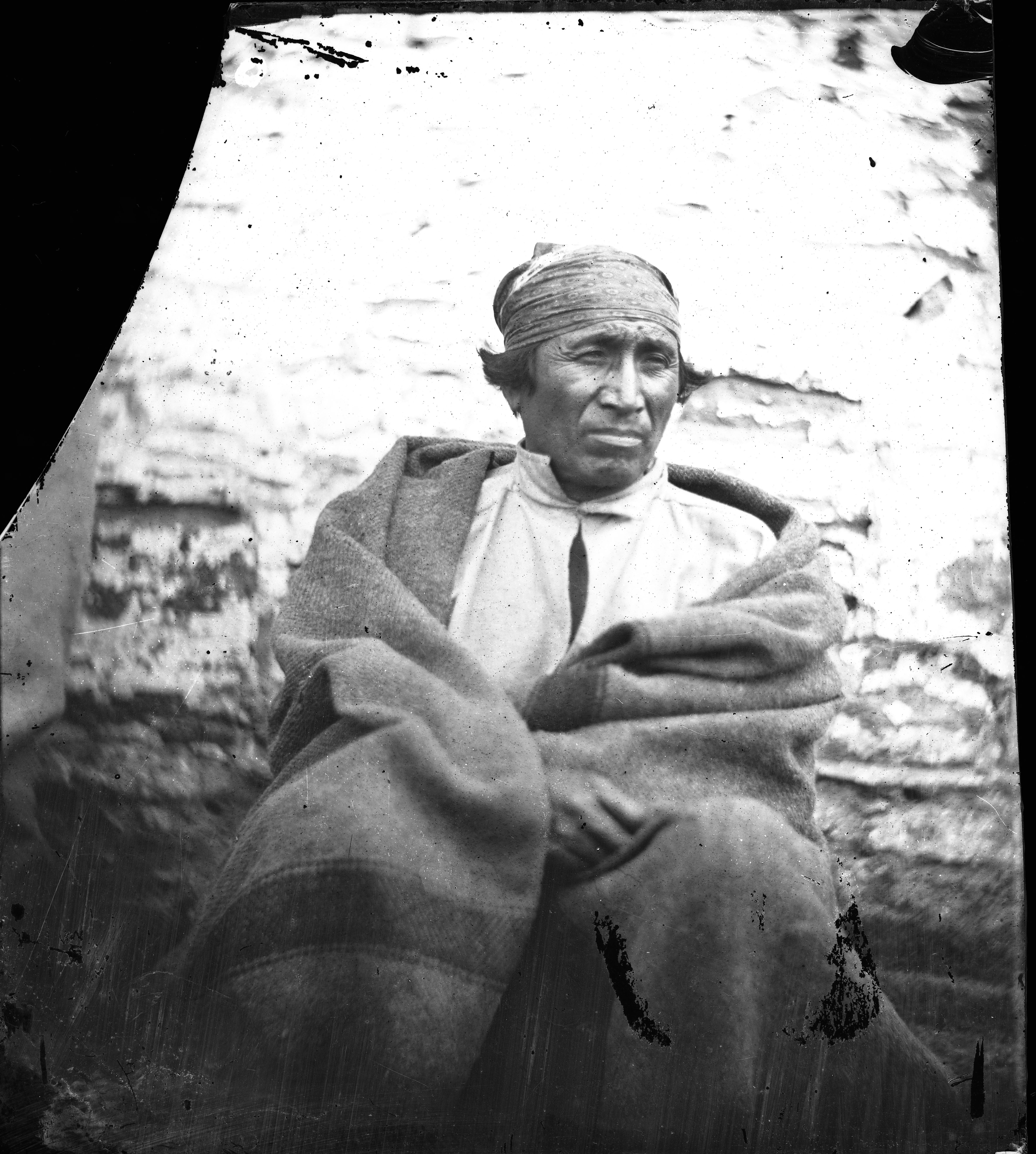
Mdewakanton Dakota Chief Shakopee III

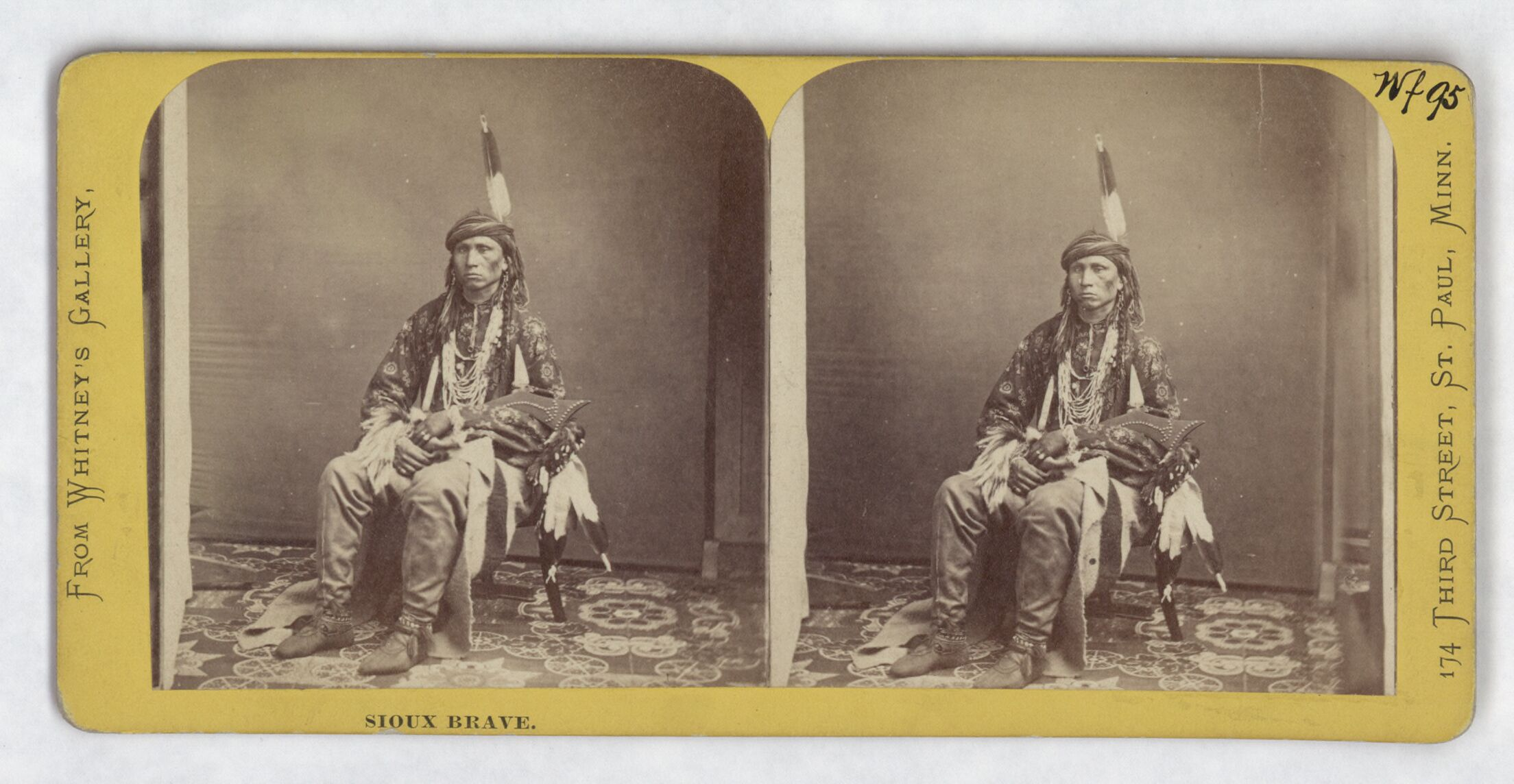
"Sioux Brave" c.1870-1875

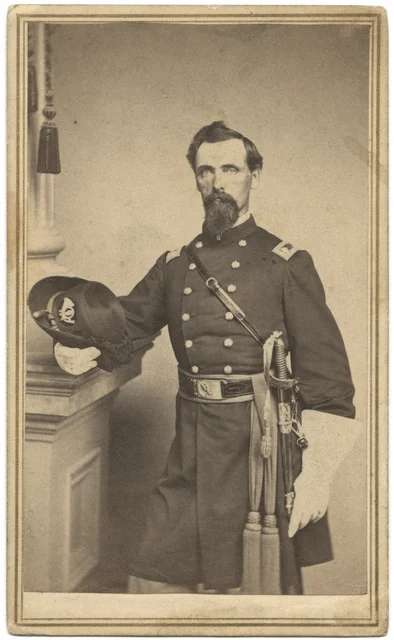
Colonel Josiah Fay Marsh of the 9th Minnesota Infantry Regiment

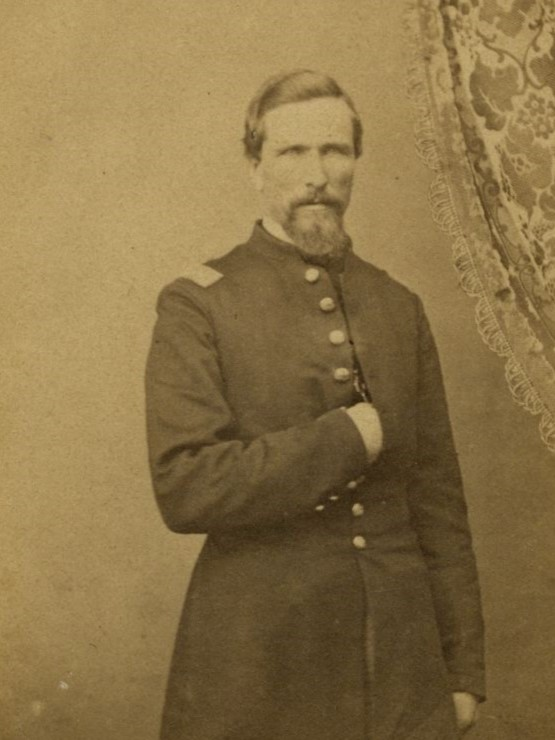
Captain Asgrim Knutson Skaro of the 2nd Minnesota Infantry Regiment

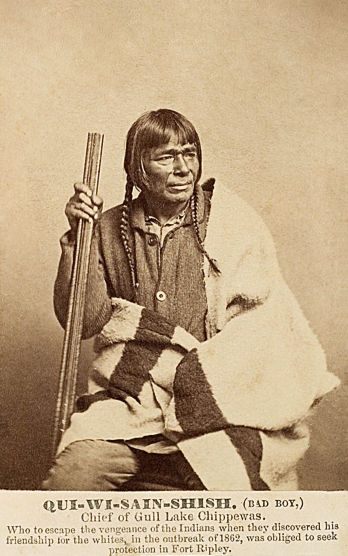
Qui-Wi-Sain-Shish (Bad Boy) of the Mississippi River Band of Chippewa Indians

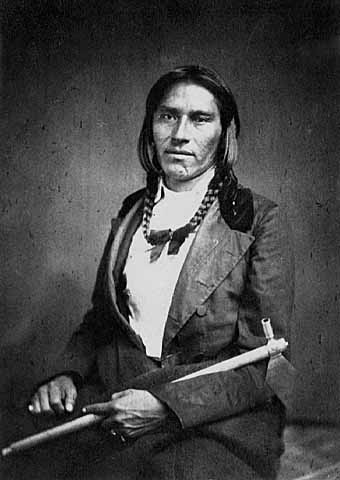
Chief Hole in the Day of the Pillager Band of Chippewa Indians

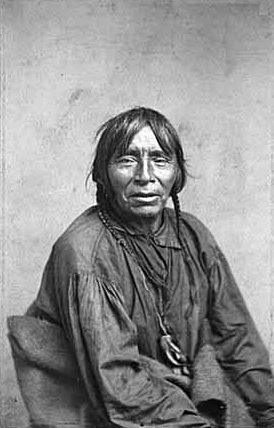
Chief Na-bah-nay-aush (One-Sided Winner), Leech Lake, ca. 1865.

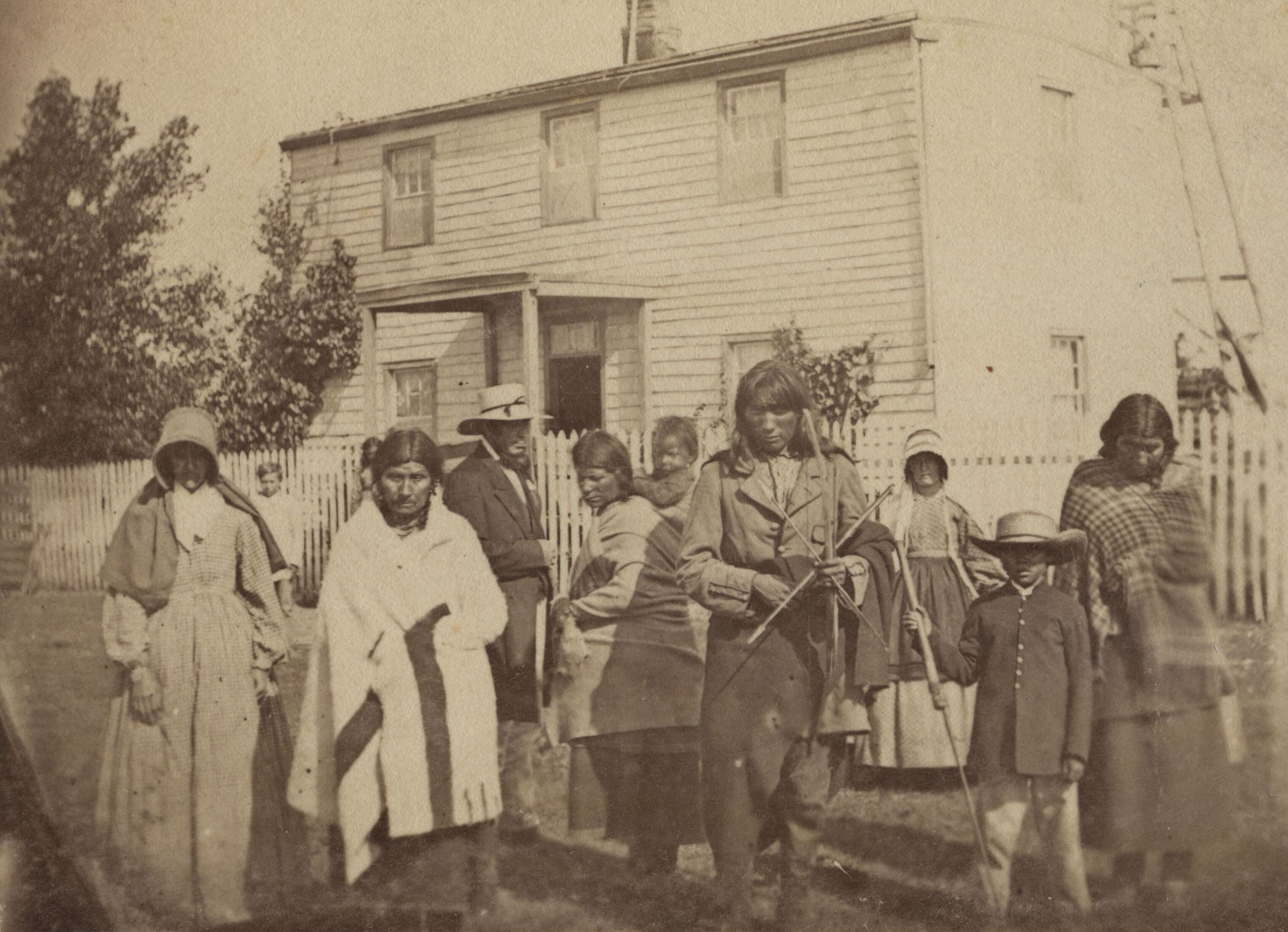
Dakota Native Americans and Dr. Thomas Smith Williamson near the Upper Sioux Agency, Minnesota c.1862

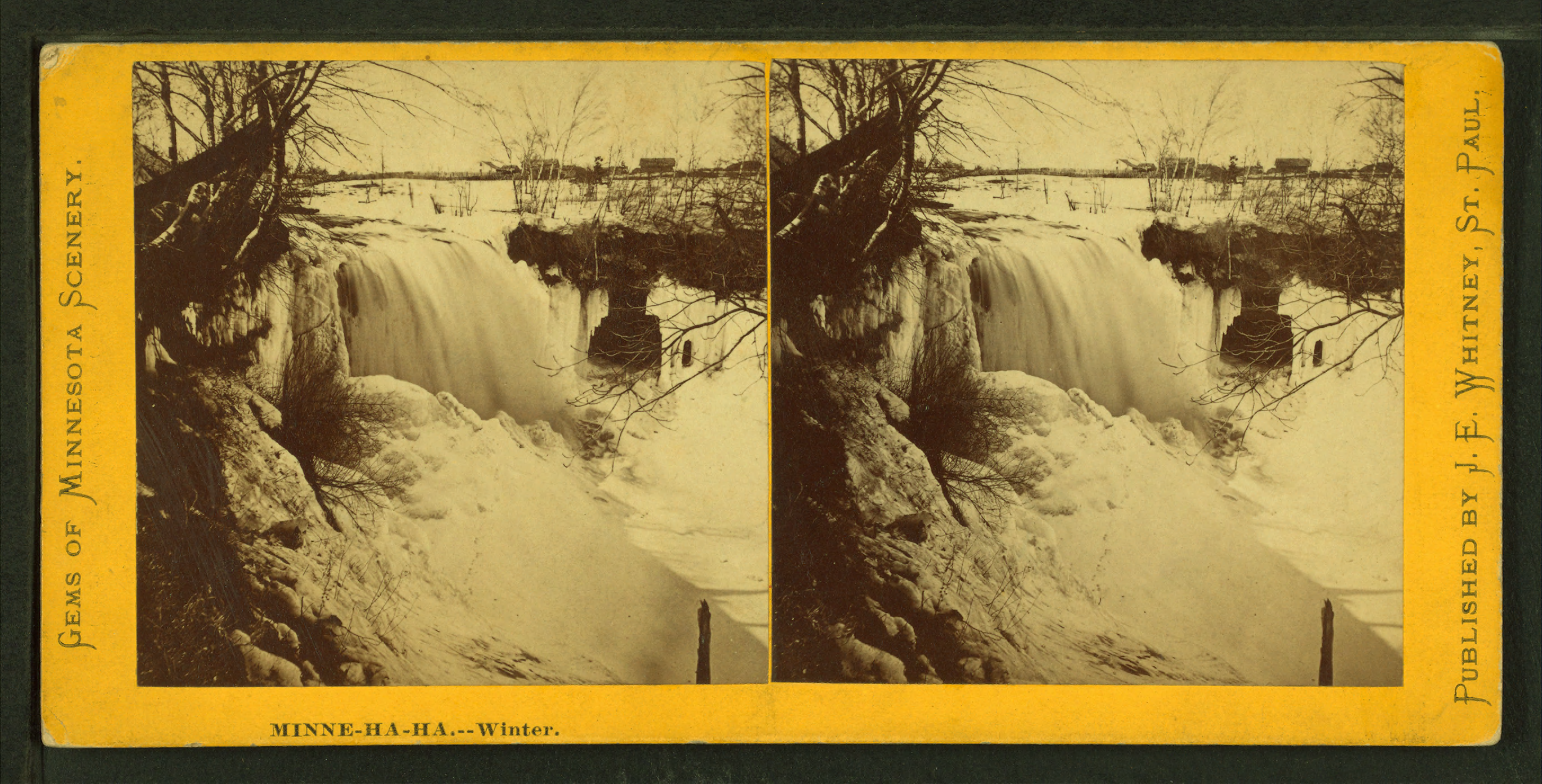
Minnehaha Falls in the winter c.1865

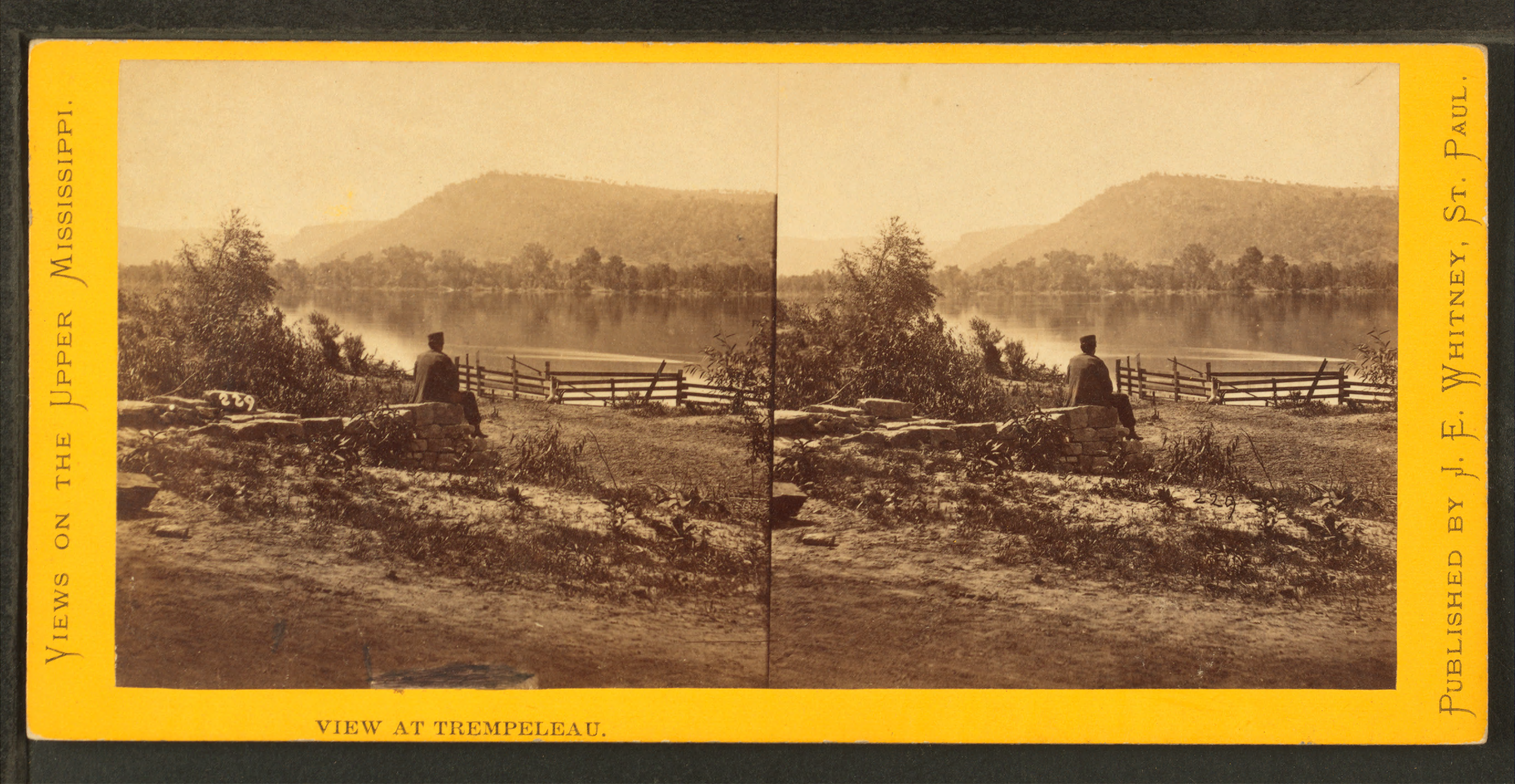
View of Trempealeau c.1865

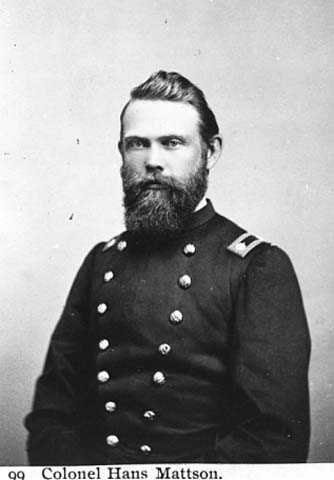
Colonel Hans Mattson of the 3rd Minnesota Infantry Regiment

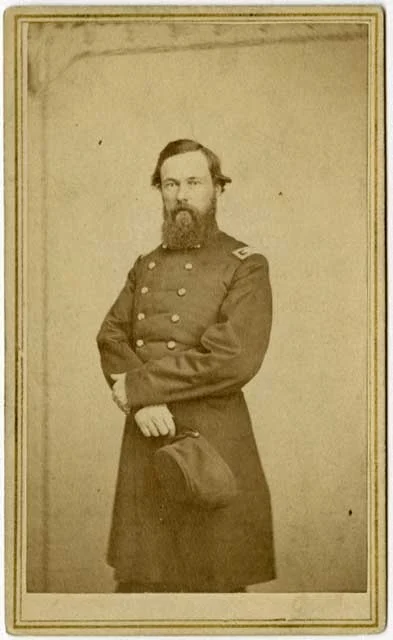
Colonel Samuel McPhail of the 1st Minnesota Cavalry Regiment

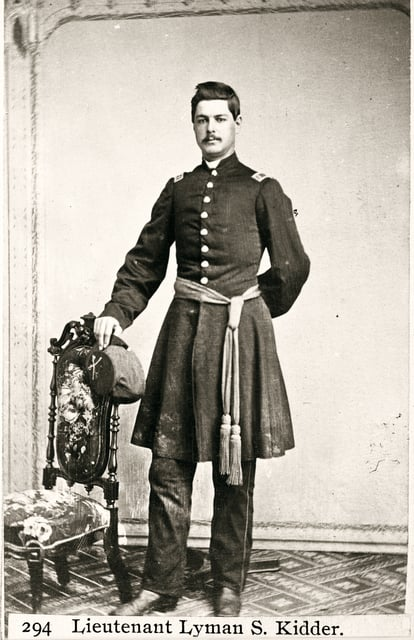
Lieutenant Lyman S. Kidder

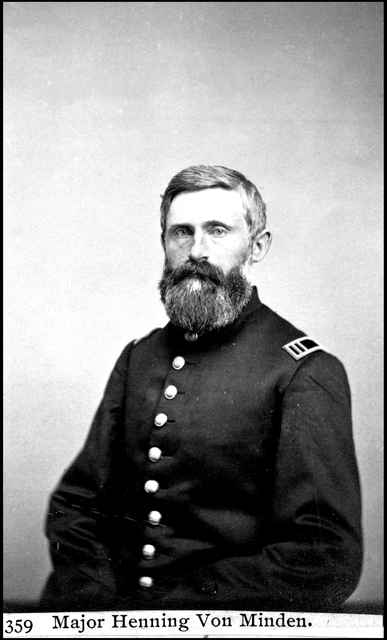
Captiain Henning Von Minden of Brackett's Minnesota Cavalry Battalion

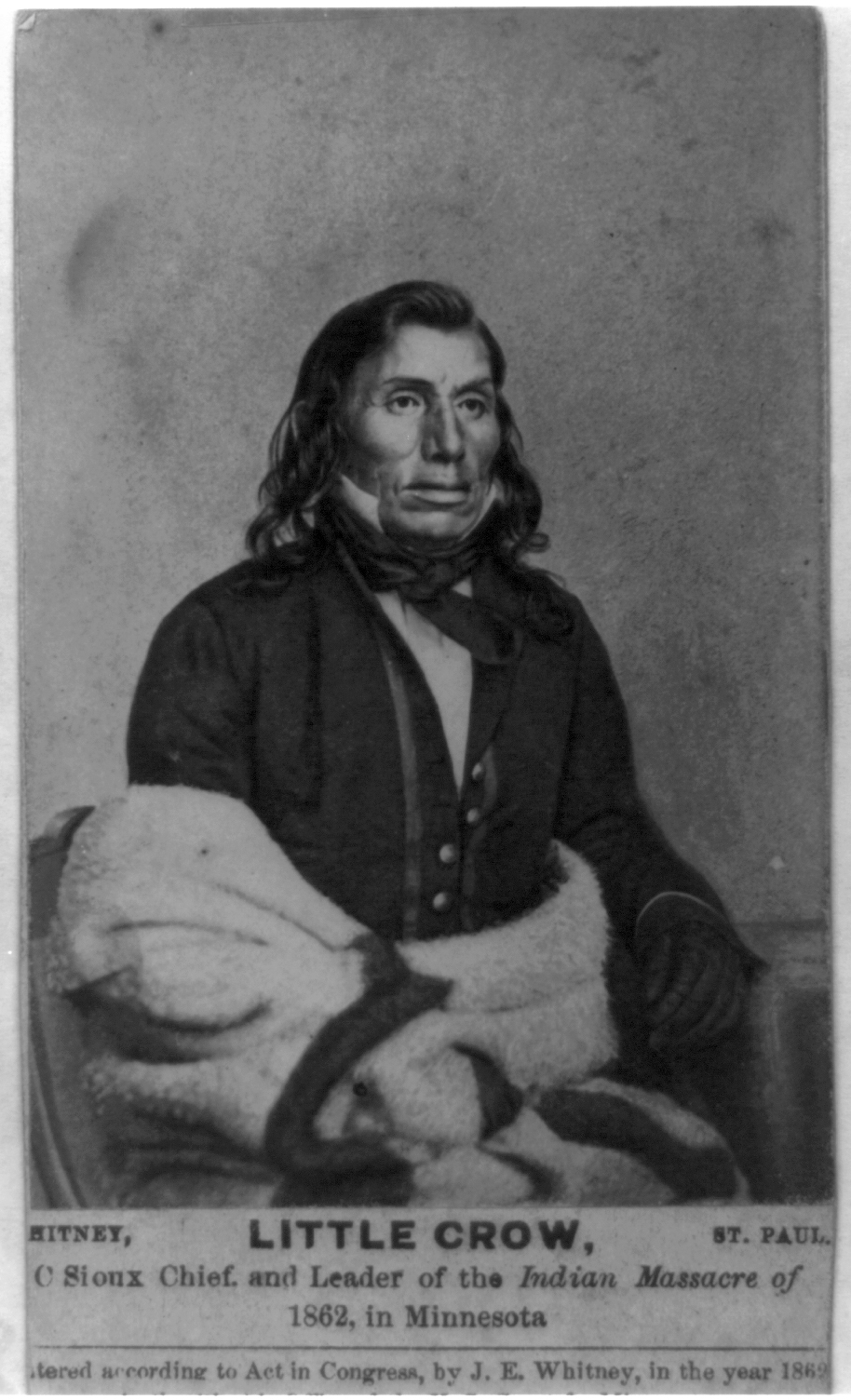
Mdewakanton Chief Little Crow c.1862
