= Carl Gutherz =

American painter

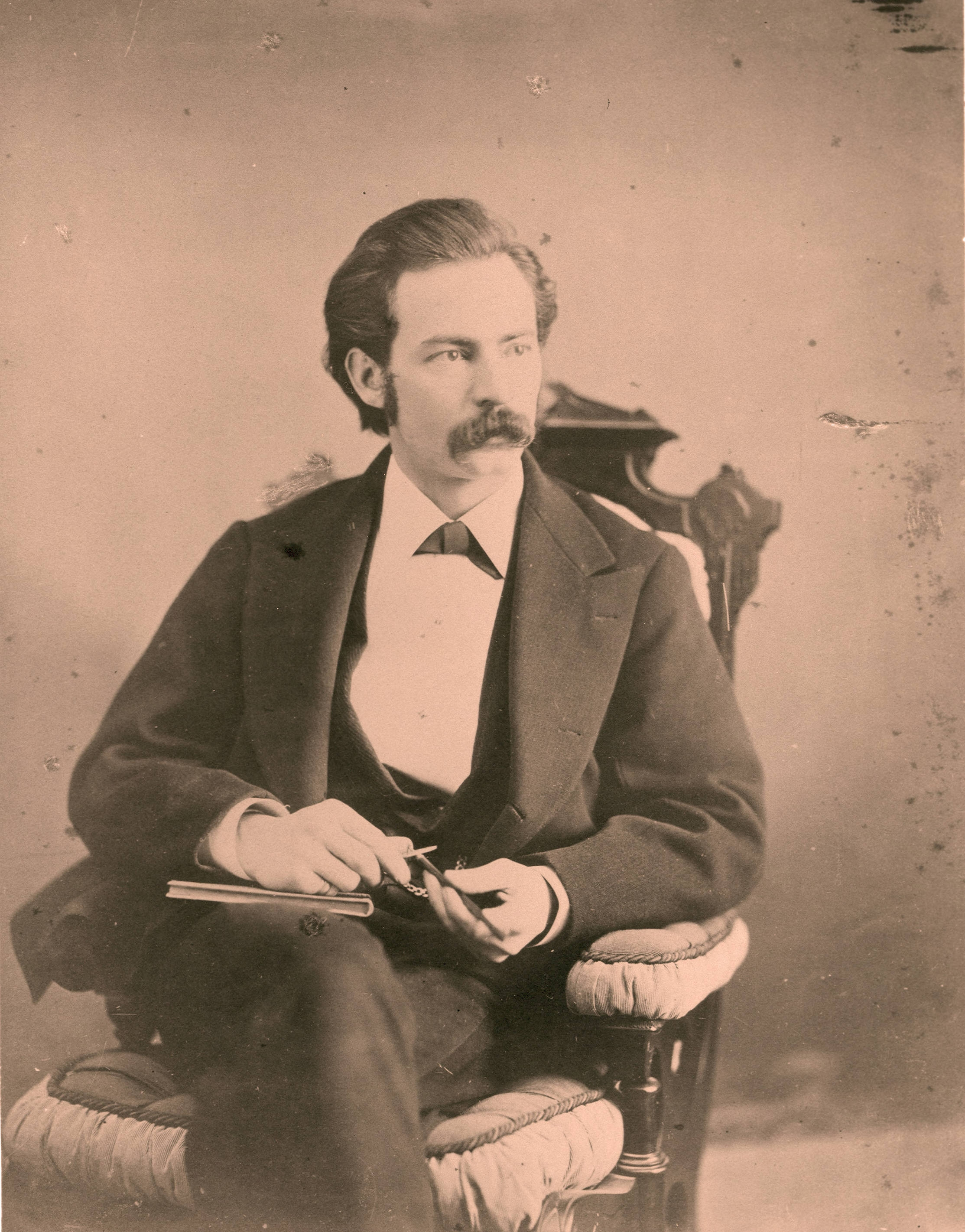
Albumen print of Carl Gutherz, c.1875

Carl Gutherz (January 28, 1844 in Switzerland – February 7, 1907 in Washington, D.C.) was a painter, part of the Symbolist movement in the United States during the 19th century.

== Biography ==
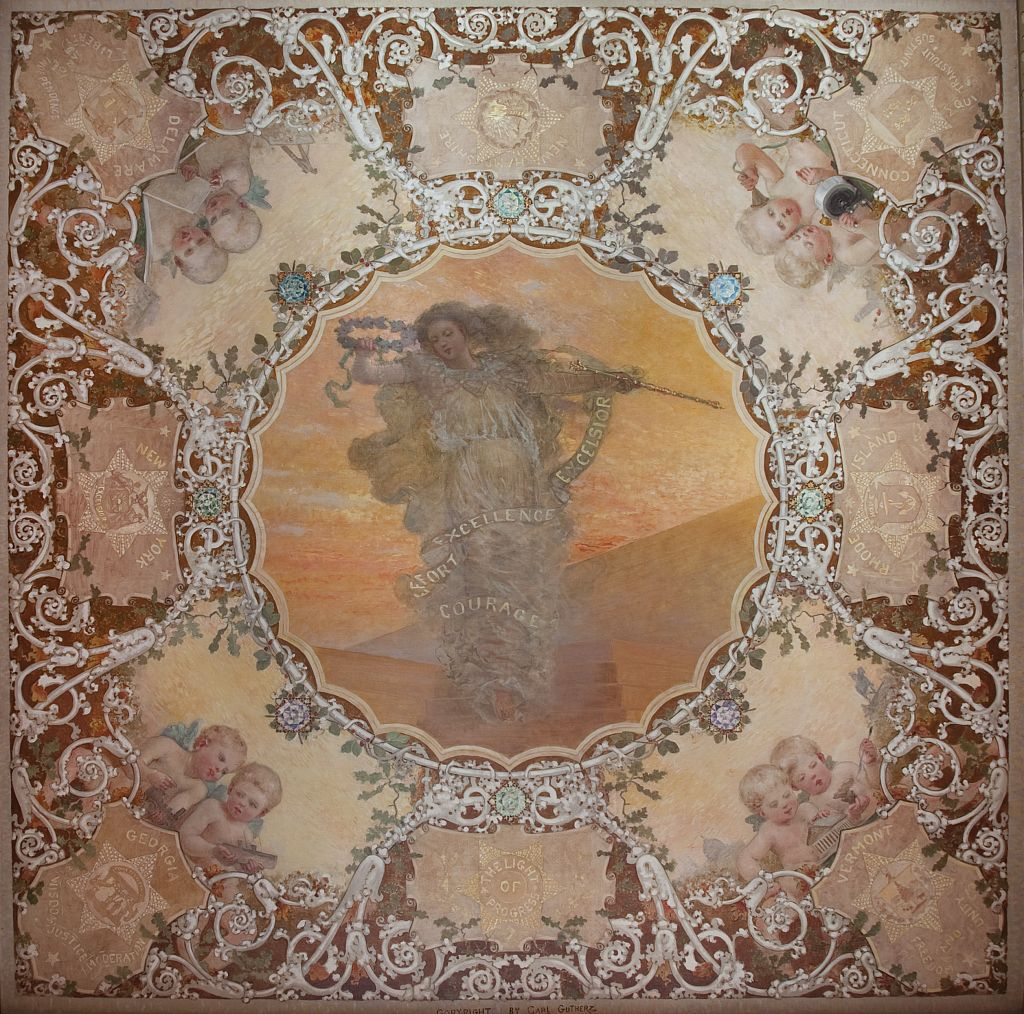
The Light of Progress mural for the Library of Congress, 1896

He came to the United States with his parents in 1851. His father settled in Cincinnati and was the first to introduce terra cotta works of art into the U.S. The son began his professional career by modeling clay in his father's studio. He later studied under a portrait painter in Memphis, Tennessee, and in 1868 went to Paris, where he studied with Joseph Cabasson and Isadore Pils, and was a pupil at the École des Beaux Arts.

At the beginning of the Franco-Prussian War, he went to Belgium, studying in Brussels and Antwerp under Stalleart and Robert. He moved to Rome in 1871, where he executed his first important work. He returned to Memphis in 1873, painting portraits and figure pieces in oil and watercolors.

In 1874 he moved to St. Louis, where he was connected with the art department of Washington University in St. Louis, and assisted Halsey Ives in the organization of the St. Louis School and Museum of Fine Arts where he taught the life class from 1876 until 1884. He sent his “Ecce Homo” and his “Awakening of Spring” to the Centennial Exposition at Philadelphia, receiving a medal and certificate for the latter work.

In 1880 and possibly after, Gutherz designed the floats and costumes for the Veiled Prophet Parade of St. Louis; his drawings were sent to Paris, France, where the costumes were made.

In 1884, he went to Paris to study in the Academie Julian. Here he became versed in the Symbolist school and studied with Gustave Boulanger and Joseph Lefebvre. He participated in the annual Paris Salon.

In 1896, he did a mural for the Library of Congress, and stayed in Washington, D.C. for the rest of his life.
