= Swan Lake (Nicollet County, Minnesota) =

Lake in the state of Minnesota, United States

- Location within Minnesota
- Location: Nicollet County, Minnesota
- Coordinates: 44°18′N 94°15.5′W
- Type: lake

Swan Lake is a shallow lake in Nicollet County, in the U.S. state of Minnesota.

Dakota people named the lake Marrah Tanka, their word for swan. Trumpeter swans are native to Minnesota and nest on Swan Lake. Tundra swans migrate through the area in spring and fall, but do not nest on the lake.

== See also ==
- List of lakes in Minnesota
