= Traverse des Sioux =

- U.S. National Register of Historic Places
- Minnesota State Register of Historic Places
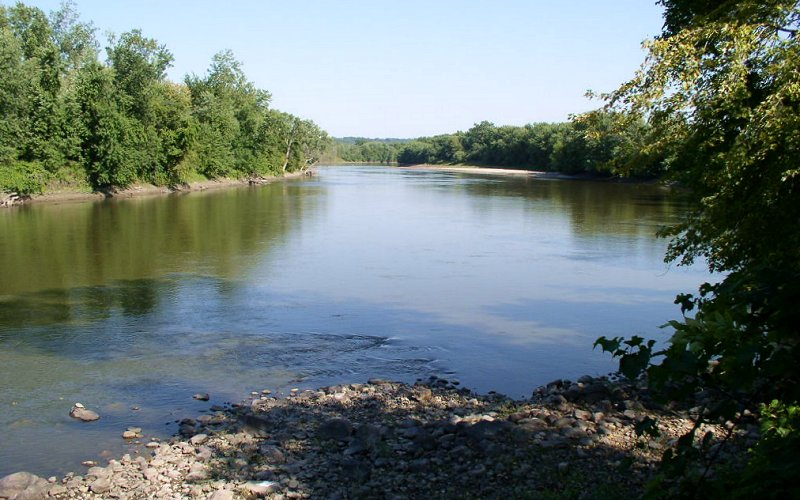
- Minnesota River at Traverse des Sioux

- Location within Minnesota Location within the United States
- Location: Nicollet County, Minnesota
- Nearest city: St. Peter, Minnesota
- Coordinates: 44°21′4″N 93°56′45″W
- Built: 1851
- NRHP reference No.: 73000990
- Added to NRHP: March 20, 1973

Traverse des Sioux is a historic site in the U.S. state of Minnesota. Once part of a pre-industrial trade route, it is preserved to commemorate that route, a busy river crossing on it, and a nineteenth-century settlement, trading post, and mission at that crossing place. It was a transshipment point for pelts in fur trading days, and the namesake for an important United States treaty that forced the Dakota people to cede part of their homeland and opened up much of southern Minnesota to European-American settlement.

Formerly a Minnesota state park, the site of the old settlement and river ford is now a State Historic Site and a Minnesota State Monument. It is listed on the National Register of Historic Places. Traverse des Sioux is located on the Minnesota River, once a major transportation route, in Nicollet County just north of the city of St. Peter. The site of the crossing was rediscovered in the early 2000s; its north and south ends were marked by PVC pipe, as the river has changed its route and the crossing is not obvious.

== Name ==
Traverse is a French word that means crossing. The term Traverse des Sioux has been applied both to the crossing of the Minnesota River at this location, and the transit of the prairie from the west.

As used by the French Canadian voyageurs and their Métis relatives and descendants, a traverse was a crossing from a safe resting place across an open area to another point of shelter, such as a voyageurs’ crossing of hazardous waters from point to point rather than along a sheltered shore, or its correlate on land, a crossing by Métis ox cart brigades of open prairie from one secure resting place to another. The settlement at Traverse des Sioux was a destination of Métis carters during the days of the Red River Trails, and was also home of a voyageur community during the same time.

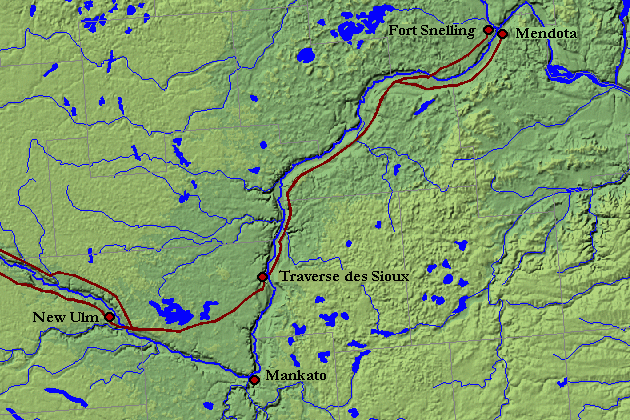
Location of Traverse des Sioux in south central Minnesota. The Minnesota River enters from the west, flows southeasterly to Mankato, where it takes a right-angle turn to the north-northeast, passing Traverse des Sioux. The West Plains Trail initially parallels the river, but at New Ulm it crosses east to Traverse des Sioux, where it rejoins and follows the river northeast to its confluence with the Mississippi at Mendota near Saint Paul.

Nineteenth-century explorer John C. Frémont used the term Traverse des Sioux to refer to the crossing of the plain west of the river. Westbound travelers left the Minnesota River at the settlement of Traverse des Sioux and went directly west across the open prairie, leaving the shelter of the wooded riverbank in order to shortcut the right-angle elbow of the river at Mankato. They returned to the river near the mouth of the Cottonwood River at modern New Ulm.

== History ==
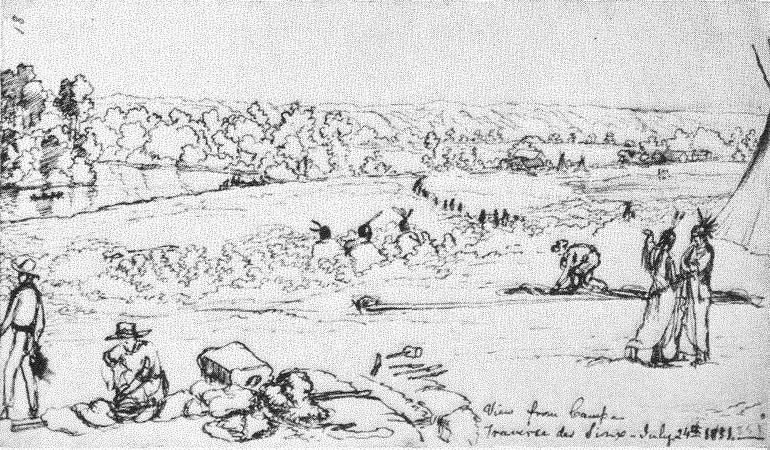
View from camp, Traverse des Sioux, July 24, 1851 Frank Blackwell Mayer The Minnesota River valley, a canoe or boat on the river, cabins, a tipi, Indians, and traders are shown.

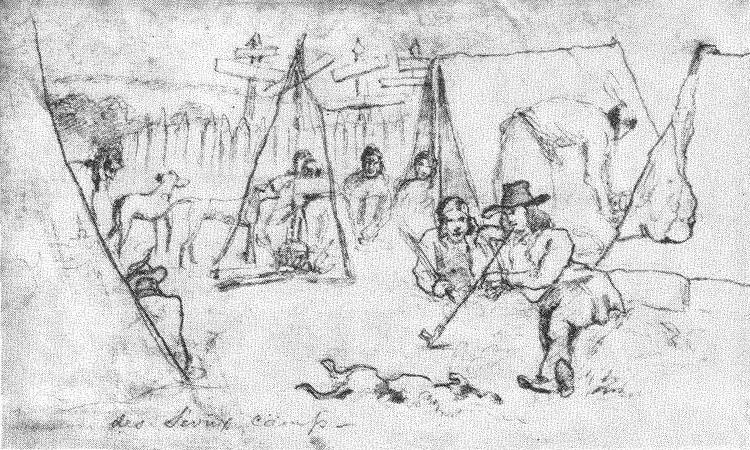
Traverse des Sioux camp Frank Blackwell Mayer, 1851.

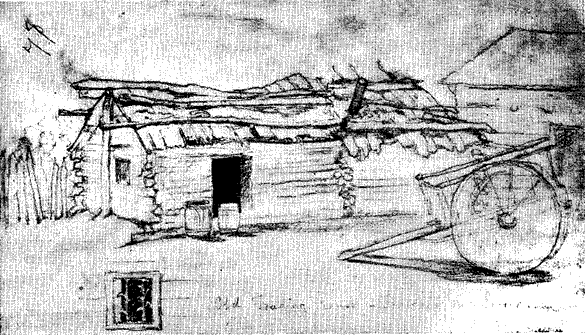
Old trader's cabin Frank Blackwell Mayer, 1851.

Native Americans had historically used a ford of the Minnesota River here from pre-contact times. A trading post at the site of the crossing likely existed by the last half of the eighteenth century, and a number of fur traders had establishments there in the first half of the nineteenth century. An Indian mission was established there in 1843.

By the 1840s it was used as a transshipment point in the fur trade. Pelts from upstream fur posts and from collection points as far away as Pembina and Fort Garry, Canada, were brought by ox cart trains traveling on the West Plains Trail, the westernmost of the Red River Trails. At Traverse des Sioux, the furs were transferred to flatboats bound for Mendota, Minnesota and eastern markets. In the later part of that period, some cart trains traveled all the way to Mendota or Saint Paul, Minnesota, whence the furs were taken by Mississippi riverboat to markets downriver. By 1851 the settlement had two missionaries and their families, a school, several fur trading establishments, a few cabins of French voyageurs, and twenty to thirty Indian lodges.

In 1851 the Treaty of Traverse des Sioux was signed at the post, by which tribes of the Sioux people were induced to cede 24 million acres (97,000 km^{2}) of land to the United States for promises of reservations and annuities at a rate of seven cents per acre. This concession opened up vast areas of Minnesota Territory to non-native settlement. The lands surrendered included Minnesota west of the Mississippi and south of the lands of the Ojibwe, all of what later became South Dakota east of the Big Sioux River, and much of northern Iowa.

After the treaty a town was platted, which kept the settlement's name of Traverse des Sioux. Its seventy buildings included two hotels, several churches, and five taverns. This town lost its position as county seat of Nicollet County in 1856, when it was superseded by designation of Saint Peter as the new seat a short distance to the south. The old town was abandoned by 1869.

== Preservation ==
In 1905 a legislative commission was formed to identify the site of making the 1851 treaty. Investigation located the spot, which was dedicated in 1914. Traverse des Sioux Treaty Site Park was established by legislative action, but little development occurred.

The park was reclassified as a state wayside park in 1937 during the Great Depression, and the state tried to acquire additional land. By 1963 those efforts had stopped. The site was inundated by the devastating 1965 floods of the Minnesota and Upper Mississippi rivers. In 1969 the state authorized expansion of the historic site, and an investigation marked the foundation ruins of the townsite. In 1980 the wayside and townsite were removed from the state park system and transferred to the control of the Minnesota Historical Society; what was considered excess land was transferred to the city of Saint Peter.

A self-guided tour of the town and treaty site is available. The Nicollet County Historical Society maintains its headquarters at the adjacent Treaty Site History Center, with exhibits about the treaty and other area history. The site is managed by the county historical society in partnership with the Minnesota Historical Society.

In 2006, historians and an engineer located the site of the historic river ford. After historians found a map published in Old Traverse des Sioux (1929) by Thomas Hughes, engineer Dick Gardner surveyed and mapped the remains of the village; he combined the two sources by computer to integrate the location of the fur post, cemetery, and other features of the historic settlement. In addition, archaeologists have found Paleo-Indian projectile points in the area estimated to be 9,000 years old, indicating this site was inhabited or visited by Native Americans for many millennia. The ends of the ford are now marked by PVC pipe, as the river has shifted course.

== Bibliography ==
- Christianson, Theodore (1935). Minnesota: The Land of Sky-Tinted Waters. Vol. I: From Wilderness to Commonwealth. Chicago and New York: The American Library Society..
- Frémont, John Charles (1886). Memoirs of My Life. Chicago and New York: Belford, Clarke & Co. ISBN 0-8154-1164-2.
- Gilman, Rhoda R.; Carolyn Gilman; Deborah M. Stultz (1979). The Red River Trails: Oxcart Routes Between St. Paul and the Selkirk Settlement, 1820-1870. St. Paul: Minnesota Historical Society Press. ISBN 0-87351-133-6.
- Hughes, Thomas (1901). "The Treaty of Traverse des Sioux in 1851". Collections of the Minnesota Historical Society. 10 (1). St. Paul, Minnesota: Minnesota Historical Society: 100–129.
- Hughes, Thomas, Map from Old Traverse des Sioux (1929), onto which has been projected the present river channel. Republished by Mankato Free Press on December 18, 2006
- Lass, William E. (1978). Minnesota, A History (2d ed.). New York & London: W.W. Norton & Co. ISBN 0-393-04628-1..
- Meyer, Roy Willard (1991). Everyone's Country Estate: A History of Minnesota's State Parks. St. Paul: Minnesota Historical Society Press. ISBN 0-87351-266-9.
- 2019 Minnesota Statutes § 138.585, subd. 28. Retrieved on 2019-12-27.
- Minnesota Historic Sites: Traverse des Sioux, Minnesota Historical Society. Retrieved on 2019-12-27.
- National Register of Historic Places, Nicollet County, Minnesota. Retrieved on 2019-12-27.
- Nute, Grace Lee (1955) [1931]. The Voyageur. St. Paul: Minnesota Historical Society. ISBN 0-87351-012-7.
- Thomas, Dylan, "Historic river crossing rediscovered", Mankato Free Press, 18 December 2006.
- "Traverse des Sioux". Nicollet County History Society.
