= Treaty with the Sioux, 1858 =

1858 US-Native American treaty

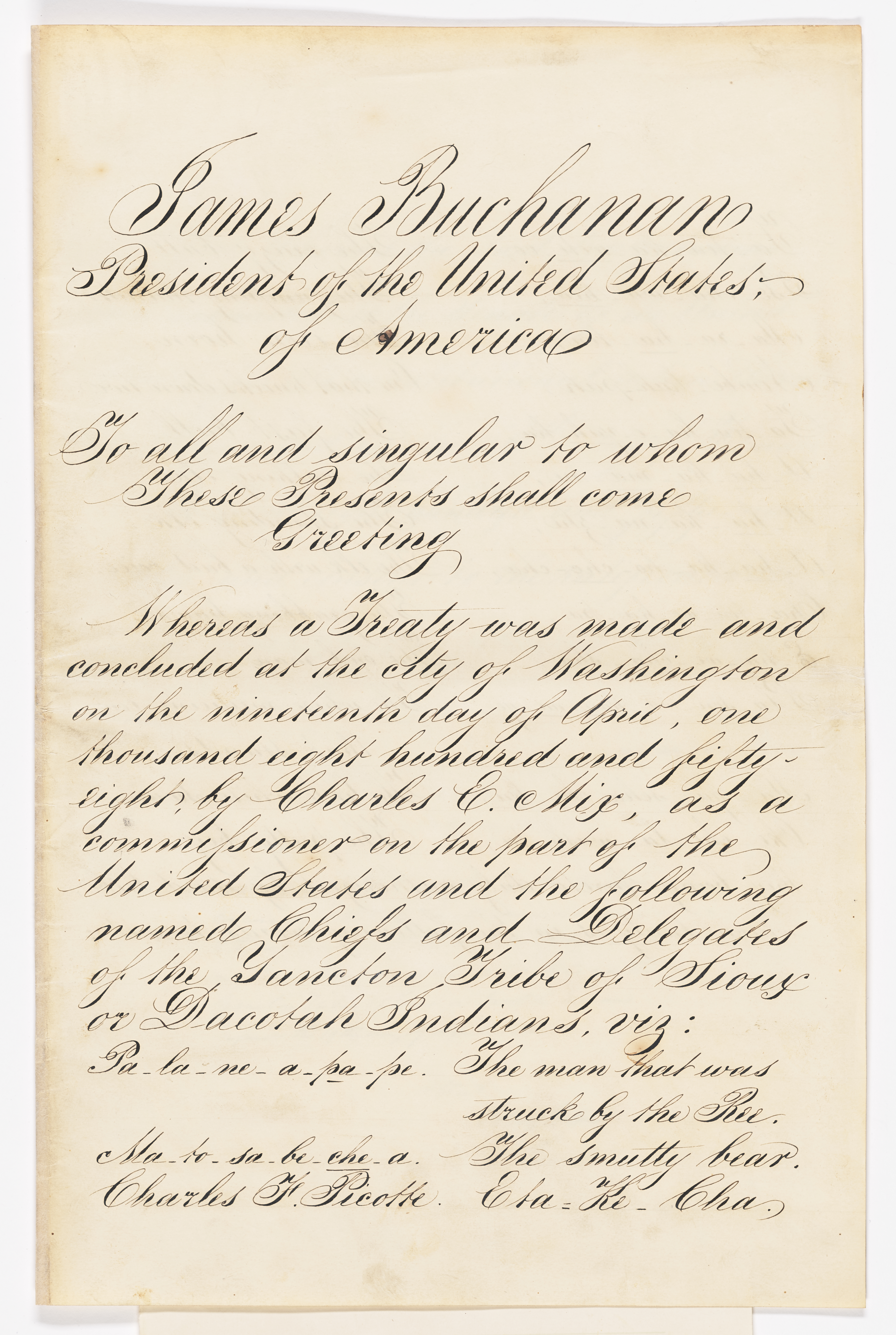
- First page of the treaty
- Type: Clarification to the Treaty of Traverse des Sioux and Treaty of Mendota
- Context: Defined the boundaries of the Lower Sioux Indian Reservation
- Signed: June 19, 1858
- Location: Washington D.C., U.S.
- Mediators: (United States) Joseph R. Brown
- Signatories: (United States) Charles Eli Mix; 9 Dakota delegates including; John Other Day and Red Iron (Ma-za-sha)
- Parties: United States; Sisseton and Wahpeton bands of the Dakota
- Depositary: United States Department of State
- Language: English

The Treaty with the Sioux, 1858 was signed on June 19, 1858, between the United States government and representatives of the Sisseton and Wahpeton bands of Dakota. This treaty defined the boundaries of the Lower Sioux reservation as that portion of the strip defined in the Treaty of Traverse des Sioux lying south of the Minnesota River. Notably, this excluded the northern half of the land previously allotted to the Indians. Additional provisions for surveying the land, allotting land to individual families, law enforcement, compensation payments, and economic development were also included.

== Background ==
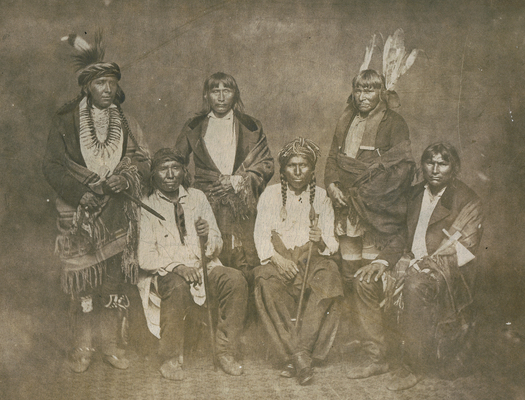
1858 Treaty Delegation of the Mdewakanton

The treaties of Traverse des Sioux (between the United States the Sisseton and Wahpeton bands of Dakota) and Mendota (between the United States and the Mdewakanton and Wahpekute bands), as signed by their representatives, committed the Eastern Dakota to live on a 20-mile (32 km) wide reservation centered on a 150 mile (240 km) stretch of the upper Minnesota River. During the subsequent ratification process by the U.S. Senate, however, the Senate removed Article 3 of each treaty, which had defined the reservations. This failure to establish a reservation on land promised to the Dakota during the negotiations for the treaties of Traverse des Sioux and Mendota left the status of the land along the upper Minnesota River ambiguous, leading to confusion and tensions with American settlers over land rights.

== Negotiations ==
During the winter of 1857–1858, ninety delegates from thirteen tribal nations traveled to Washington, D.C., including the Mdewakanton chief Little Crow, for negotiations with President Buchanan and the United States government. The delegation primarily consisted of leaders from the eastern Dakota bands (Mdewakanton, Wahpekute, Sisseton, and Wahpeton), who sought to address unresolved issues from the Treaties of Traverse des Sioux and Mendota (1851). These 1851 treaties had committed the Dakota to a 20-mile-wide (32 km) reservation along a 150-mile (240 km) stretch of the upper Minnesota River. During ratification, the U.S. Senate had removed Article 3 from both treaties, which defined the reservation boundaries, leaving the Dakota’s land rights ambiguous. This failure to establish a legally defined reservation led to encroachments by white settlers, delays in annuity payments, and economic hardship, prompting the Dakota to seek clarification and fairer terms in 1858.

On April 19, 1858, representatives of the Yankton (western Dakota) signed the Yankton Treaty, ceding approximately 11 million acres in present-day South Dakota for a 400,000-acre reservation along the Missouri River. This agreement stirred debate between Little Crow and Commissioner of Indian Affairs Charles E. Mix, the lead U.S. negotiator. The eastern Dakota, particularly the Mdewakanton and Sisseton, contended that some of the ceded Yankton land overlapped with their traditional hunting grounds and ancestral territories, which they had used prior to the 1851 treaties. The eastern Dakota’s frustration was compounded by the U.S. government’s practice of negotiating separately with Sioux bands, which ignored their shared territorial claims and the ambiguity left by the 1851 treaties’ unratified reservation provisions.

On June 19, 1858, representatives of the eastern Dakota signed the Treaty with the Sioux in Washington, D.C. The Mdewakanton and Wahpekute bands agreed to a redefined Lower Sioux reservation, limited to the land south of the Minnesota River, while the Sisseton and Wahpeton bands secured a separate Upper Sioux Indian Reservation on the north of the river. These treaties aimed to resolve the land status ambiguity from 1851 but required the Dakota to cede additional territory in exchange for annuities and goods. Despite these efforts, the 1858 treaties failed to fully address Dakota grievances, as continued settler encroachment, delayed annuities, and disputes over land rights fueled tensions that contributed to the U.S.-Dakota War of 1862.

== Treaty ==
The provisions of the treaty can be summarized as follows:

Article 1: The reservations for the Sisseton and Wapheton were defined as that port of the land allotted to the Indians in the treaties of Traverse des Sioux and Mendota lying south or west of the Minnesota River and occupied by those bands. Eighty acres of reservation land were to be allotted to each head of a family or single person over the age of twenty-one. The remaining land was to be held in common by the bands, with provisions for subsequent allotments to minors upon reaching adulthood or marrying.

Article 2: This article addressed previous treaty amendments, confirming the right of the bands to occupy and retain certain lands. It also raised questions regarding compensation for lands relinquished by the bands, which were subject to Senate approval.

Article 3: In the event of land sales authorized by the Senate, provisions were made for the allocation of funds to cover debts and expenses incurred by the bands. However, these decisions required approval from relevant government officials.

Article 4: Lands retained by the bands were designated as Indian reservations, subject to U.S. laws governing trade and interaction with Native American tribes.

Article 5: The United States retained the right to establish and maintain military posts, schools, and other facilities within the reservation, with compensation provided for any damages caused to individual Indian properties.

Article 6: The bands pledged to maintain friendly relations with the United States and other tribes, refrain from hostilities, and assist in apprehending offenders. Provisions were made for the punishment of band members engaging in prohibited activities, such as the consumption of intoxicating liquors.

Article 7: Annuities to the bands could be withheld from members engaging in prohibited activities, such as the consumption of intoxicating liquors.

Article 8: Members of the bands were granted the option to dissolve tribal connections and obligations, provided they settled beyond the reservation limits.

Article 9: The Secretary of the Interior was granted discretion over the annual expenditure of funds allocated to the bands, with the aim of promoting their welfare and advancement in civilization.

Article 10: The United States government agreed to cover the expenses associated with negotiating the treaty.

== Aftermath ==
Little Crow and the Dakota expected to negotiate about the enforcement of existing treaties, and in particular about the late arrival of treaty payments and abuses by traders. Instead, Little Crow returned having lost half of the reservation land that he and his people had understood to be reserved to them in perpetuity under the treaties of Traverse des Sioux and Mendota. This was a major blow to his status in the eyes of his people, and a significant contributor to the outbreak of the 1862 Dakota War.
