= Treaty of Traverse des Sioux =

Upper Dakota land cession treaty of 1851 with United States

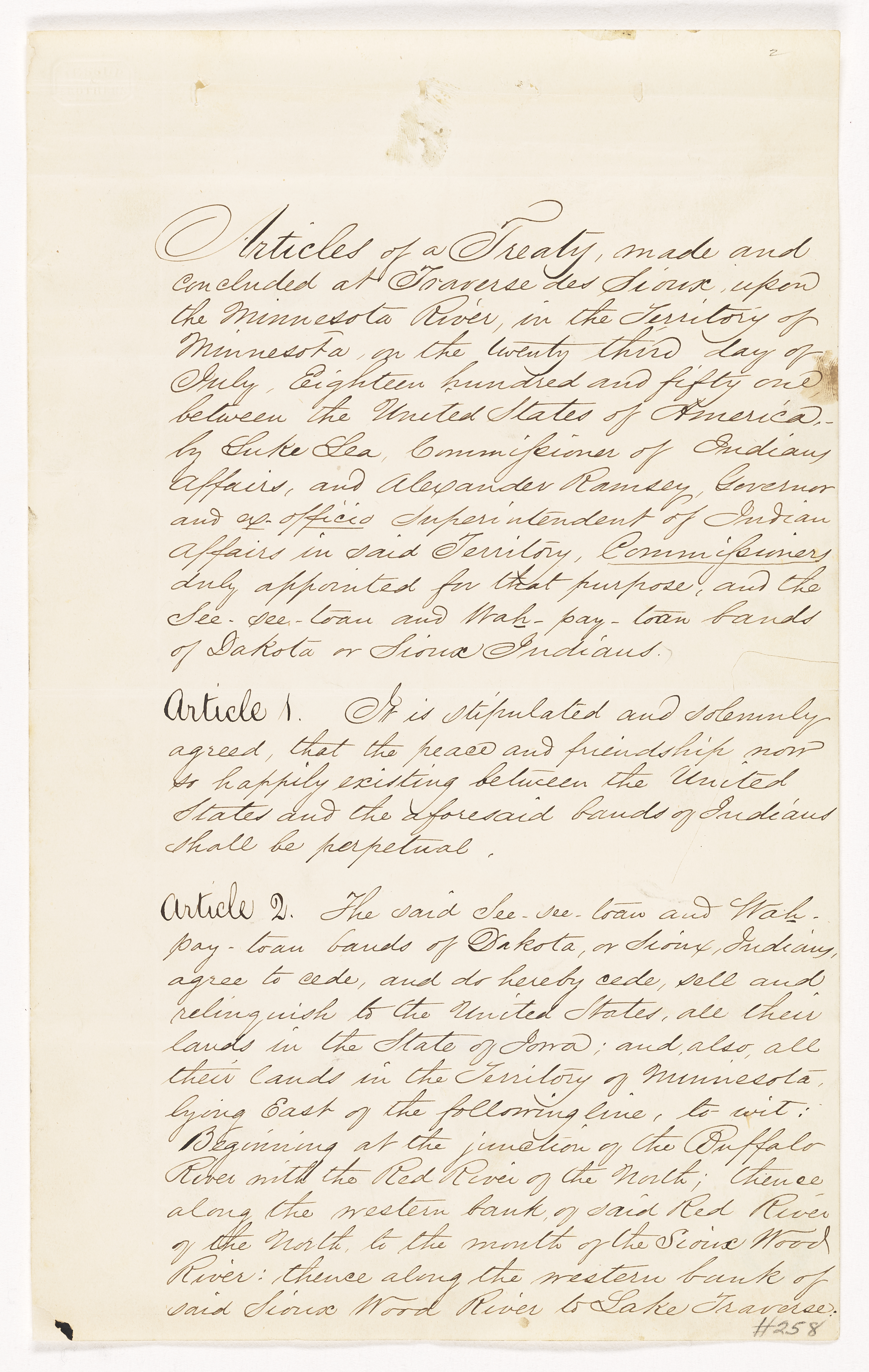
- First page of the treaty
- Type: Land cession treaty
- Context: Westward expansion into western and southern Minnesota
- Signed: July 23, 1851
- Location: Traverse des Sioux near St. Peter, Minnesota Territory, U.S.
- Condition: Transfer of $1,665,000 in gold annuity payments and goods to natives; Natives to allow American settlement of purchased land; Natives resettled to the Upper Sioux Indian Reservation and Lower Sioux Indian Reservation along the Minnesota River
- Mediators: (United States) Henry Hastings Sibley; (United States) Joseph R. Brown; (United States) Martin McLeod; Thaóyate Dúta; Ti'Wakan
- Signatories: Alexander Ramsey; Luke Lea; 35 Dakota Chiefs including; Ishtakhaba and Cloud Man
- Parties: United States; Sisseton Wahpeton Oyate
- Depositary: United States Department of State
- Language: English

The Treaty of Traverse des Sioux (10 Stat. 949) was signed on July 23, 1851, at Traverse des Sioux in Minnesota Territory between the United States government and the Upper Dakota Sioux bands. In this land cession treaty, the Sisseton and Wahpeton Dakota bands sold 21 million acres of land in present-day Iowa, Minnesota and South Dakota to the U.S. for $1,665,000.

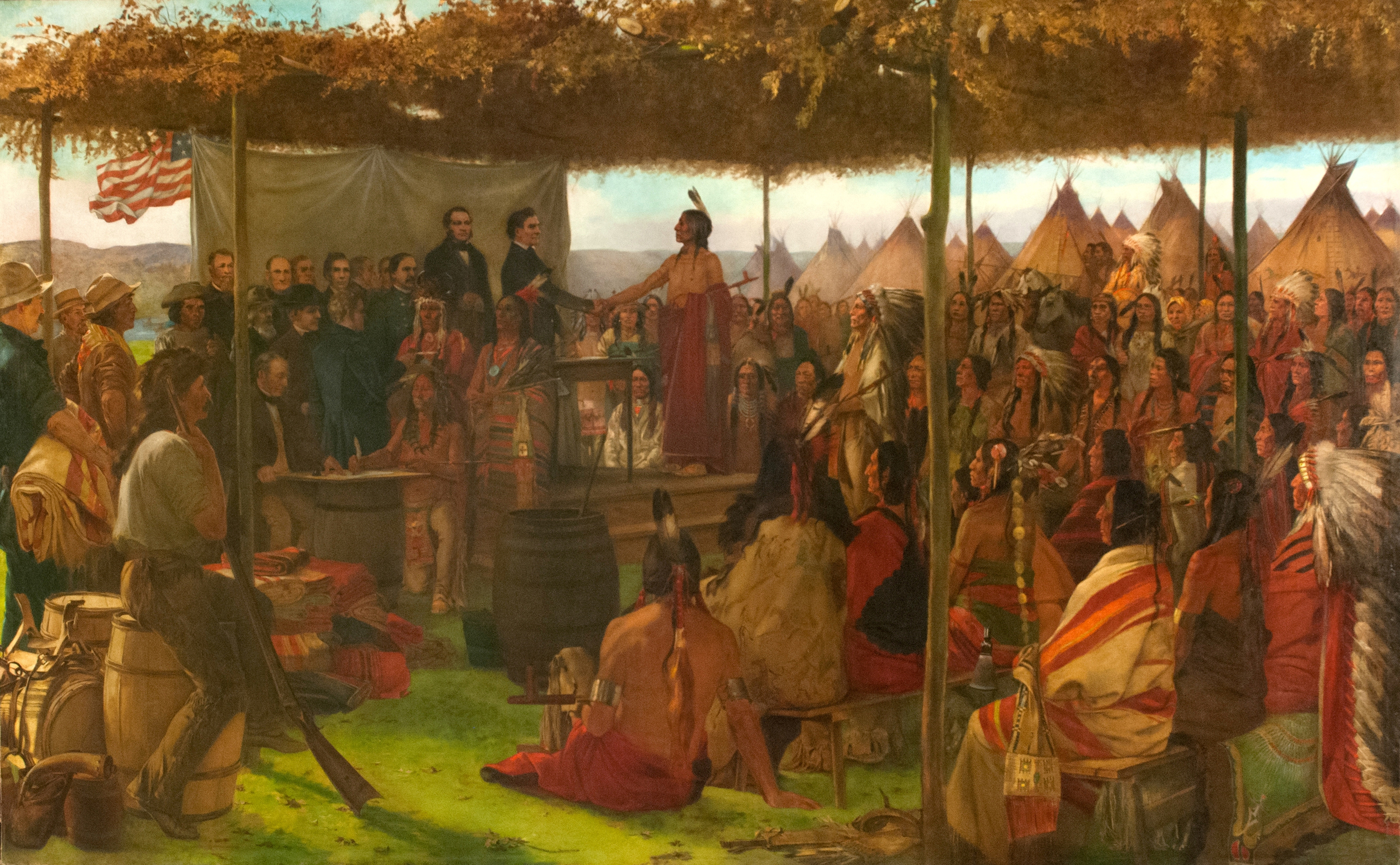
Treaty of Traverse des Sioux by Francis Davis Millet

The treaty was instigated by Alexander Ramsey, the first governor of Minnesota Territory, and Luke Lea, Commissioner of Indian Affairs in Washington, D.C. They were assisted by territorial Congressional delegate Henry Hastings Sibley and the traders who sought compensation for business losses which appeared on their books as "Indian debts."

Governor Ramsey and Commissioner Lea justified the Treaty of Traverse des Sioux and the Treaty of Mendota to the United States Congress on the basis of an "overwhelming tide of migration...increasing and irresistible in its westward progress."

== Background ==
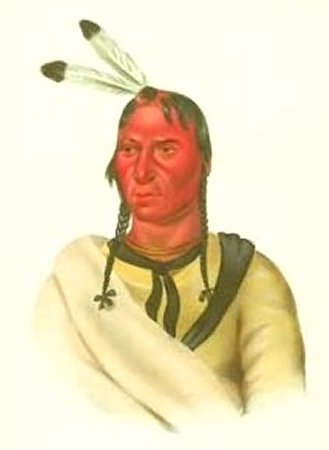
Sleepy Eye was the region's elder statesman.

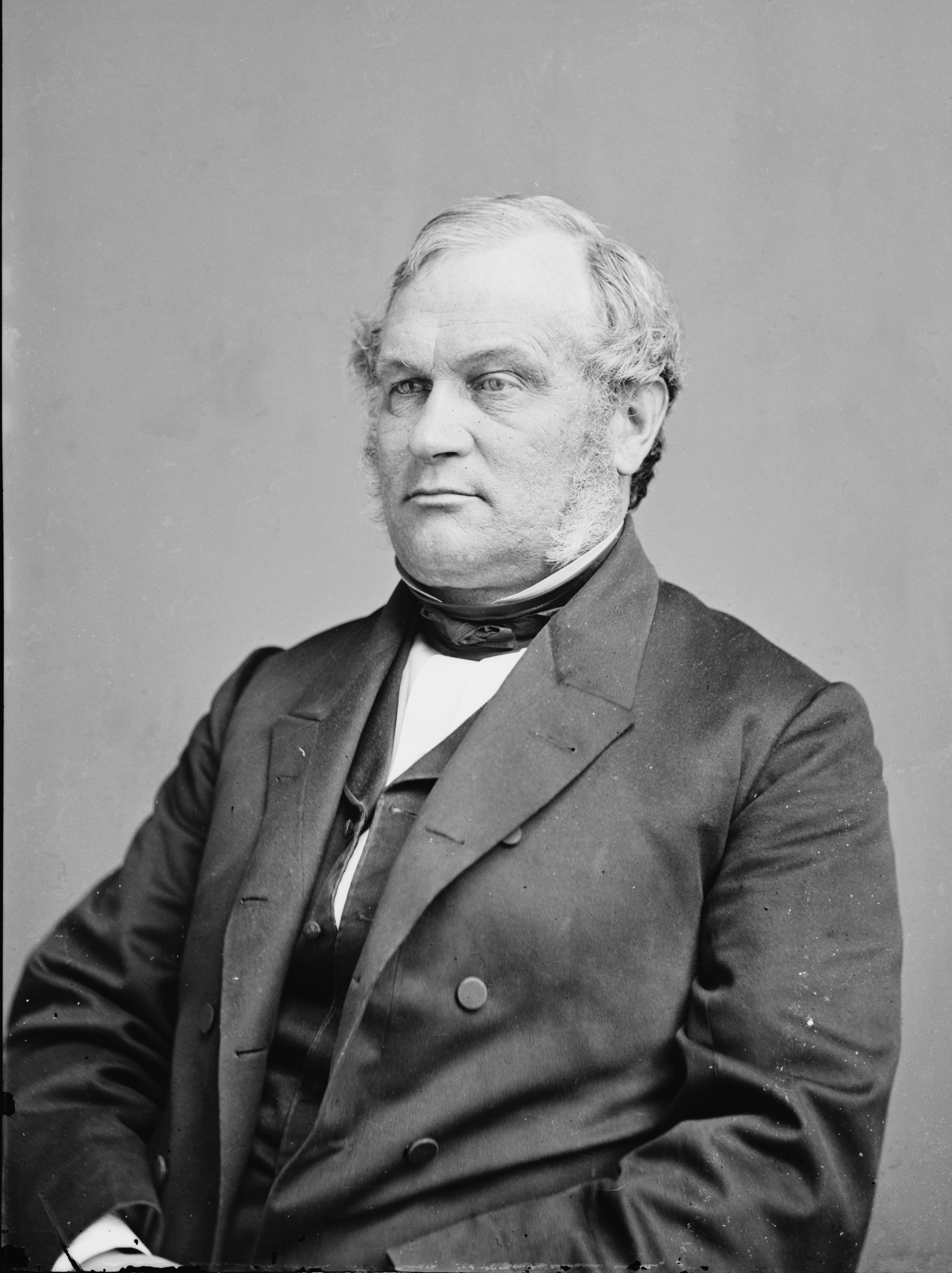
Governor Alexander Ramsey

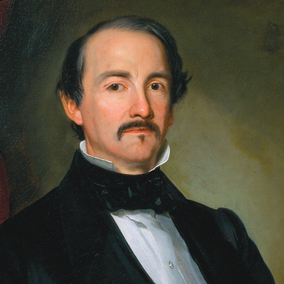
Congressional delegate Henry Hastings Sibley

In the fall of 1849, Governor Alexander Ramsey had tried and failed to purchase land from the Dakota. Ramsey had initially offered less than three cents per acre – an offer that failed to gain much interest among Dakota leaders – and was largely ignored.

Past treaty payments to fur traders had already become a national scandal. An act of the United States Congress passed on March 3, 1847 prohibited annuities, money and goods to be paid to anyone other than heads of families or individuals in all future treaties. Nevertheless, Henry Hastings Sibley was determined to collect compensation for the traders.

Sibley informed Governor Ramsey that he would withhold his support for future land cession treaties, if the Dakota were not "allowed" to pay off their "past debts." Ramsey came to appreciate that Sibley and other traders wielded significant influence among the Dakota, and that he was more likely to succeed with their help.

By 1850, Ramsey and Sibley had arrived at an understanding. Governor Ramsey agreed to raise his offer from 2 1/2 cents to 10 cents per acre, and agreed to find a way of securing funds for the traders and their "mixed-blood" clerks and kin. Sibley also encouraged Ramsey to replace the previous treaty commissioner, former Iowa Territory Governor John Chambers, with another commissioner less likely to oppose these measures.

Sibley proceeded to build support for a new treaty. To win over the Dakotas, he directed his traders to go back to awarding credit and giving gifts liberally to reinforce their kinship ties, even if they resulted in short-term losses. To win over the mixed-blood community, he promised to lobby for the sale of the "half-breed tract" along Lake Pepin, granted to them in the 1830 Treaty of Prairie du Chien. The land had remained largely unoccupied, but it was communally owned and they lacked the right to sell it.

To win over the missionaries, Sibley emphasized how a massive sale of land would make it impossible for the Dakota to hunt and force them into farming. By replacing their communal lands with individually owned farm plots, the Dakota would become more "civilized" and more open to embracing Christianity.

On the advice of trader Martin McLeod, Sibley decided to treat with the Upper Dakota bands – the Sisseton and Wahpetons – first. McLeod reported that after a succession of bad winters, the western bands had suffered from hunger, often bordering on starvation, and were desperate for relief. In fact, he was confident that "they would sign almost anything." Once the Upper Dakota had signed a treaty, they reasoned, the Mdewakantons and Wahpekutes would surely follow.

Former fur trader Joseph R. Brown recruited his mixed-blood brother-in-law, Gabriel Renville (Tiwakan), to help build support for the treaty among Sisseton and Wahpeton leaders. Historian Gary Clayton Anderson writes, "Given the circumstances, Renville, in working with Brown, obviously assumed that he was helping his people out of what had become an increasingly unsustainable lifestyle."

== Negotiations ==
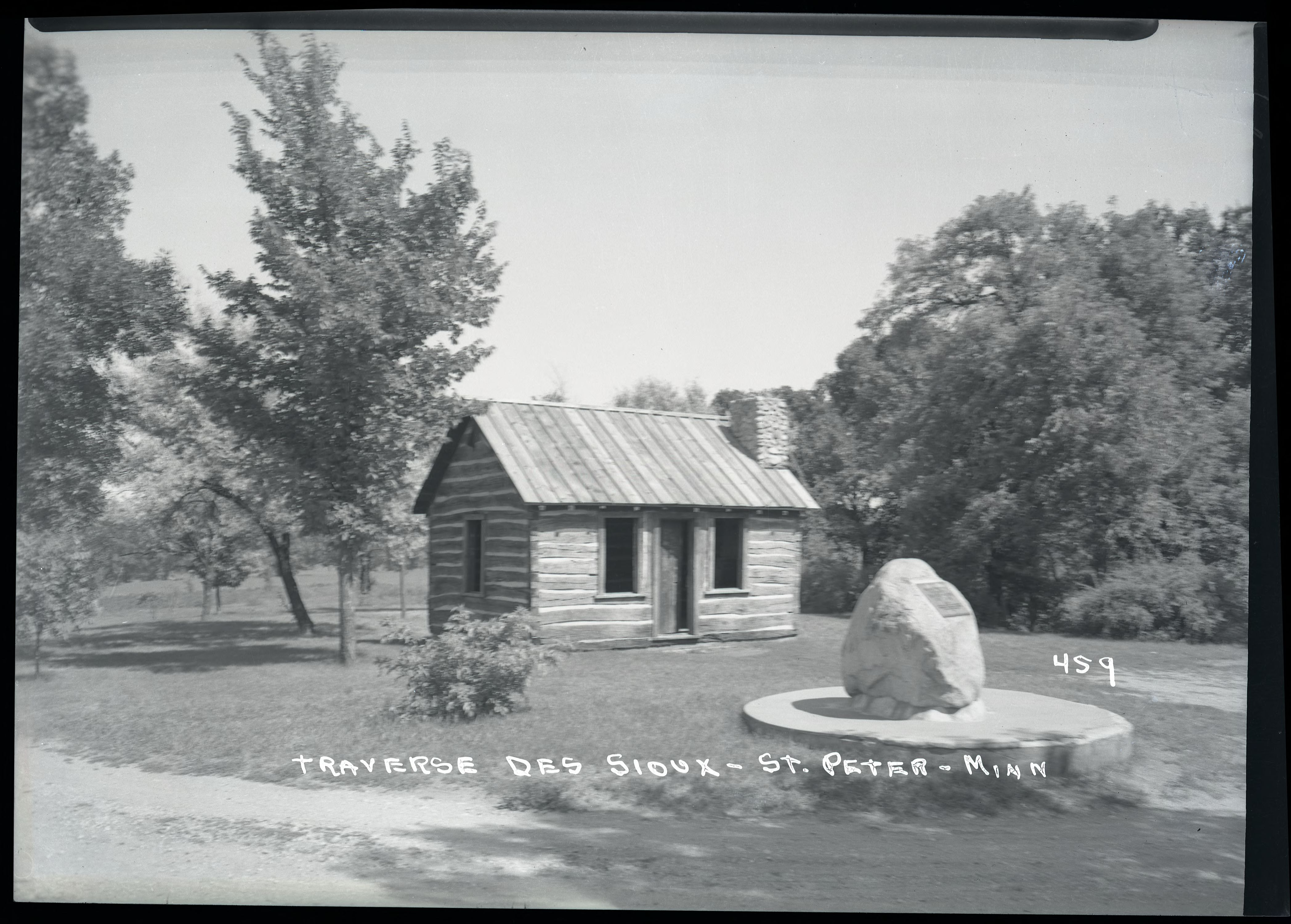
Traverse des Sioux Treaty site

At 5:30 am on June 29, 1851, the treaty commissioners left Fort Snelling on board the steamboat Excelsior, traveling with a large group including newspaper reporters, as well as traders and "mixed-blood" assistants associated with Henry Hastings Sibley. They arrived at Traverse des Sioux before noon the following day.

The Wahpeton and Sisseton bands of the Upper Dakota (sometimes spelled Dahkotah on treaties) were hesitant to sign away so much land, but older members of the tribes believed that the results of the 1825 First Treaty of Prairie du Chien and the Black Hawk War limited their choices.

== Treaty ==
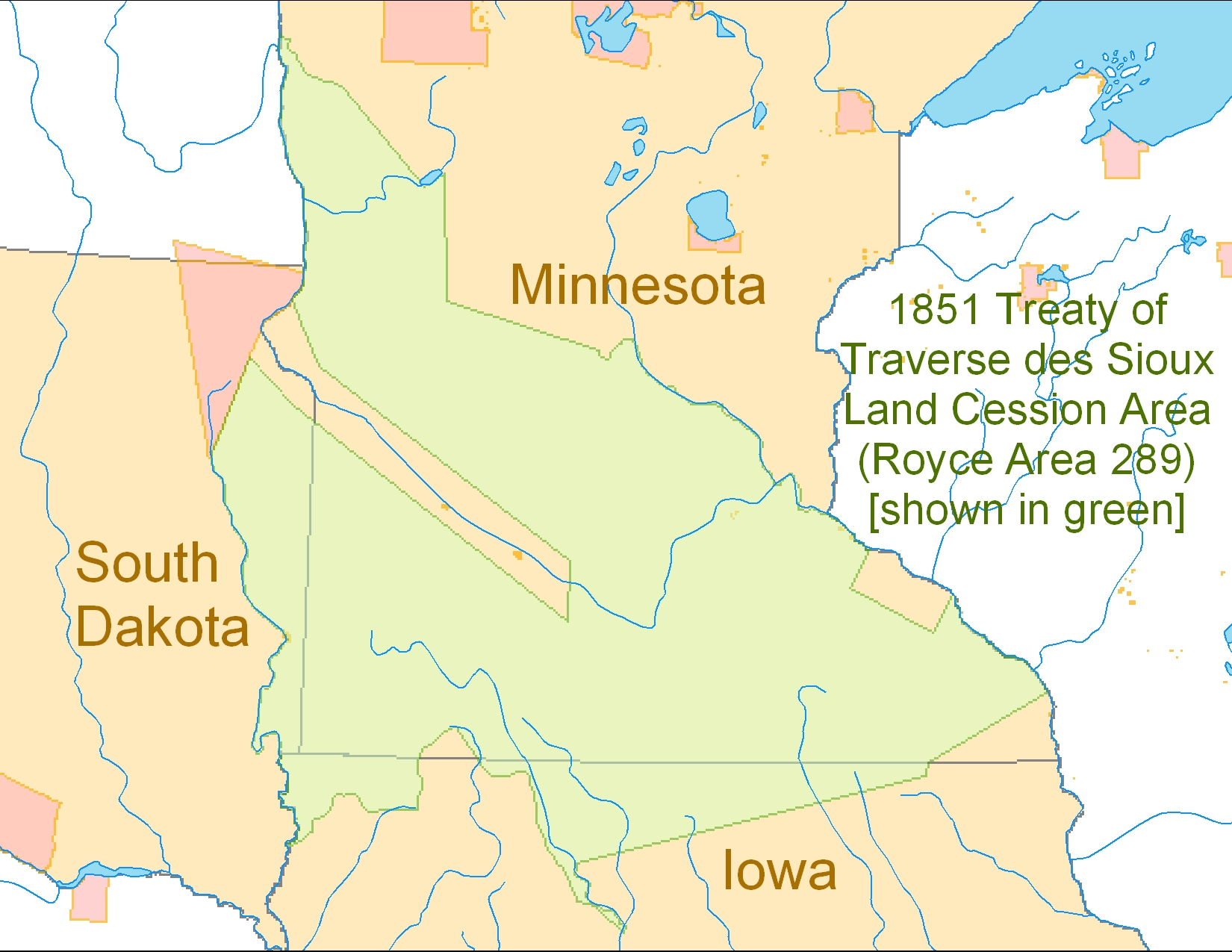
Treaty of Traverse des Sioux land cession area shown in green across northern Iowa, southern Minnesota and eastern South Dakota.

The Wahpeton and Sisseton bands ceded their lands in southern and western Minnesota Territory, along with some lands in Iowa and Dakota Territory. In exchange, the United States promised payment of $1,665,000 in cash and annuities.

Through the Treaty of Traverse des Sioux and the Treaty of Mendota, the Mdewakanton and Wahpekute bands of the Lower Sioux ceded territory of nearly 24,000,000 acres (97,000 km^{2}) of land. The US paid the Dakota an annuity the equivalent of 7.5 cents an acre and charged settlers $1.25 an acre.

The US set aside two reservations for the Sioux along the Minnesota River, each about 20 miles (30 km) wide and 70 miles (110 km) long. Later the government declared these were intended to be temporary, in an effort to force the Sioux out of Minnesota.

The Upper Sioux Agency was established near Granite Falls, Minnesota, while the Lower Sioux Agency was established about 30 miles (50 km) downstream near what developed as Redwood Falls, Minnesota. The Upper Sioux were not satisfied with their reservation because of low food supplies, but as it included several of their old villages, they agreed to stay. The Lower Sioux were displaced from their traditional woodlands, and were dissatisfied with their new territory of mostly prairie.

The Sioux also resented the separate "trader's paper" that was included in the treaty. Traders' papers were documents that contained the names of traders, included in the aforesaid claims, who were due fees from previous trades. At signing of the Traverse des Sioux treaty, the assembled chiefs were led to an upright barrel where an old acquaintance of the tribe, Joseph R. Brown, stood. The trader's paper sat on the barrel, and the assembled chiefs, assuming it was a third copy of the treaty, signed the paper without comment. This paper ensured that the cash annuity, to be paid the Sioux for fifty years, went directly to the traders instead for several years. Further claims that were subsequently added ultimately ensured the tribe received no money from the Treaty of Traverse des Sioux.

Mni Sota Makoce: The Land of the Dakota by Gwen Westerman and Bruce White analyzes and translates back into English the Dakota-language version of the treaty for the first time, highlighting discrepancies between what the Dakota and treaty negotiators thought they were agreeing with.

== Aftermath ==
Despite these issues, the crush of settlers moving into the area meant more Anglo European people encroaching on Sioux land. As the US had promised increased annuity payments in exchange for more land cessions, Sioux leaders went to Washington, D.C. in 1858 to sign another pair of treaties, the Yankton Treaty and the Sisseton-Wahpeton Treaty; these ceded the reservation north of the Minnesota River.

The US intended the treaties to encourage the Sioux to convert from being nomadic hunters gathers to Anglo European farming, offering them compensation in the transition. The forced change in lifestyle and the much lower than expected payments from the federal government caused economic suffering and increased social tensions within the tribes. Tensions erupted in the Dakota War of 1862.

== Terms ==
The preamble begins with,

Articles of a treaty made and concluded at Traverse des Sioux, upon the Minnesota River, in the Territory of Minnesota, on the twenty-third day of July, eighteen hundred and fifty-one, between the United States of America, by Luke Lea, Commissioner of Indian Affairs, and Alexander Ramsey, governor and ex officio superintendent of Indian affairs in said Territory, commissioners duly appointed for that purpose, and See-see-toan and Wah-pay-toan bands of Dakota or Sioux Indians ...

— Treaty with the Sioux-Sisseton and Wahpeton Bands, 1851

The abbreviated terms of the treaty were:

1. Peace and friendship shall be perpetual
2. Land to cede
3. Stricken out by U.S. Senate.
4. Payments and other payments held in trust.
5. Laws against liquors in Indian country.
6. Rules and regulations to protect the rights of persons and property among the Indians.

Signers included Sleepy Eye, of the Sisseton Sioux.

== See also ==
- List of treaties
- Treaty of Mendota
- Yankton Treaty
- Sisseton-Wahpeton Treaty, 1858
