= Tim Busse =

American politician

13th Mayor of Bloomington, Minnesota
- Incumbent
- Assumed office January 2, 2020
- Preceded by: Gene Winstead

At-Large member of the Bloomington City Council
- In office 2012–2020
- Preceded by: Amy Darr Grady
- Succeeded by: Jenna Carter

Personal details
- Born: 1965/66
- Spouse: Heather Dorsey
- Education: St. Cloud State University; Humphrey School of Public Affairs
- Website: www.busseforbloomington.com

Timothy Busse (born 1965/66) is an American politician who has served as mayor of Bloomington, Minnesota since 2020.

He attended St. Cloud State University from 1983 until his graduation in 1989 with a Bachelor of Arts. He then attended the Humphrey School of Public Affairs from 1989 until his graduation with a Masters of Arts in 1992. He later served as the Communications Director for the University of Minnesota from 1999 until 2003, then as Director of External Relations for the St. Thomas University College of Law from 2003 until 2006.

Busse moved to Bloomington in 2005. Busse was first elected as an at-large member of the Bloomington city council in 2011, serving two four-year terms in that office. In 2019 Busse was elected mayor of Bloomington. Busse campaigned on a platform of expanded affordable housing and commercial development. He was elected to a second term in 2023. Busse was able to win re-election with 58% of the vote, a feat he said he was "not surprised" by.

In September of 2025, following the Annunciation Catholic Church shooting, Busse joined Jacob Frey and Melvin Carter at a press conference in which they spoke in favor of a ban on assault-style weapons and high-capacity magazines. Busse stated that if no state-level action was going to be taken, then a law banning local governments from enacting gun legislation should be repealed.

Busse delivers annual 'State of the City' addresses. In the 2026 State of the City, delivered on March 12th of that year, Busse condemned Operation Metro Surge and praised "our community and our neighbors [for rising] up like never before. Raising money, delivering groceries, dropping people off at work and school, standing up and with our neighbors."

== Electoral history ==
Mayor results, 2019
Candidate
Candidate	Votes	%
Tim Busse	9,955	55.74%
Ryan Kulka	7,868	44.06%
Write-ins	36	0.20%
Total active votes	17,859	100.00
Source: Minnesota Secretary of State

Results by precinct: Busse: 50%–60%; 60%–70%; Clark: 50%–60%

Mayor results, 2023
Candidate	Round 1	
Candidate	Votes	%
Tim Busse (incumbent)	11,859	58.11
David Clark	8,512	41.71
Write-ins	37	0.18
Total active votes	20,408	100.00
Source: Bloomington City Clerk's Office

== See also ==
- List of mayors of Bloomington, Minnesota
