= James H. Lindau =

American politician

8th Mayor of Bloomington, Minnesota
- In office January 10, 1977 – December 31, 1987
- Preceded by: Robert M. Benedict
- Succeeded by: Kurt Laughinghouse

James H. Lindau was an American politician from Minnesota, who served as the eighth Mayor of Bloomington, Minnesota from 1977 to 1987, serving a record six terms. He was the second-longest serving mayor, after Gene Winstead, mayor from 2000 to 2020.

Lindau became president of the Minneapolis Grain Exchange after losing his campaign for a seventh term. There is a street (Lindau Lane) named after him in front of the Mall of America. He won the spirit of hospitality award and the Legacy award for outstanding community service in 1998.

== Time as Mayor ==
In 1982, The Normandale Office Park was constructed with the completion of the first four buildings in the area. In 1987, The City approved plans to build the Mall of America.

In 1986, Lindau ran for Governor of Minnesota, losing the Republican nomination to Cal Ludeman.
