= List of mayors of Bloomington, Minnesota =

This page lists the individuals who have served as mayor of Bloomington, Minnesota.

Bloomington's mayors are full councilmembers who serve at large.

The term of office was two years until 1995, when voters approved a change to four-year terms.

| No. | Mayor | Years | Elected | Notes |
|---|---|---|---|---|
| 1 | Herman Kossow | 1953–1955 | 1953 | |
| 2 | Gordon Miklethun | 1956–1961 | 1957; 1959 | |
| 3 | Herbert A. Knudsen | 1962–1963 | 1961 | |
| 4 | Donald R. Hasselberg | 1964–1967 | 1963; 1965 | |
| 5 | John A. Thomasberg | 1968–1969 | 1967 | |
| 6 | James M. King | 1970–1973 | 1969; 1971 | |
| 7 | Robert M. Benedict | 1974–1977 | 1973; 1975 | resigned January 3, 1977 to become MN state senator |
| 8 | James H. Lindau | 1977–1987 | 1977; 1979; 1981; 1983; 1985 | appointed on January 10, 1977, elected in November 1977 |
| 9 | Kurt Laughinghouse | 1988–1989 | 1987 | |
| 10 | Neil W. Peterson | 1989-1995 | 1989; 1991; 1993 | resigned mid-term on January 3, 1995 to join Metropolitan Council |
| 11 | Coral Houle | 1995–1999 | 1995; 1997 | appointed January 3, 1995 to replace Peterson; was elected in own right in November 1995, first woman to serve as mayor |
| 12 | Gene Winstead | 2000–2019 | 1999; 2003; 2007; 2011; 2015 | longest serving mayor |
| 13 | Tim Busse | 2020– | 2019; 2023 | elected in November 2019, incumbent |
