= Robert M. Benedict =

American politician

Member of the Minnesota Senate from the 38th district
- In office January 3, 1977 – January 4, 1981
- Preceded by: Jerome Blatz
- Succeeded by: William Belanger

7th Mayor of Bloomington, Minnesota
- In office January 2, 1974 – January 3, 1977
- Preceded by: James M. King
- Succeeded by: James H. Lindau

Personal details
- Born: August 8, 1950 (age 76)
- Party: Independent
- Spouse: Pauline
- Children: 2
- Education: University of Minnesota

Robert M. Benedict (born August 8, 1950) is an American author, business owner and former politician from Minnesota, and at that time, a member of the Democratic-Farmer-Labor party. He published his first book in 1972 and entered the political scene a year later.

== Education ==
Benedict graduated from the University of Minnesota in 1972.

== Political career ==
In 1973, he was the National Director of the Center for Improved Child Nutrition. While in the position, he was brought to speak in favor of increasing the quality and size of school lunches in public schools by the Select Committee on Nutrition and Human Needs.

Benedict was elected mayor of Bloomington, Minnesota at the age of 23 and served in that capacity from 1974 to 1977. He was elected three times during that period, but resigned midway through his third term to represent district 38 in Hennepin County in the Minnesota State Senate. He served from 1977 to 1981. At that time, he was the youngest person ever to enter the state senate, being just 26 when he was elected.

== After politics ==
In 1984, Benedict founded Benedict Negotiating Seminars and has served as president ever since. He has written multiple books, such as The Possible Dream,Negotiating in the real world of publishing and engineering,The Freedom Account, and Happiness doesn't just happen, published in 1972, 1989, 2015 and 2019 respectively.
