= Local option =

Devolved legal authority

A local option is the ability of local political jurisdictions, typically counties or municipalities, to allow decisions on certain controversial issues within their borders, usually referring to a popular vote.

== Prohibition of alcohol ==
As described by an encyclopedia in 1907, local option is the "license granted to the inhabitants of a district to extinguish or reduce the sale of intoxicants in their midst." A 1911 Encyclopædia describes it as "specifically used in politics of the power given to the electorate of a particular district to choose whether licences for the sale of intoxicating liquor should be granted or not." This form of "local option" has also been termed "local veto."

Local option regarding alcohol was first used in the temperance movement as a means to bring about prohibition gradually. In the 1830s, temperance activists mobilized to restrict licenses in towns and counties in New England. By the 1840s, temperance reformers demanded state laws to allow local voters to decide whether any liquor licenses would be issued in their localities. Some 12 states and territories had some form of the early local option laws by the late 1840s. Controversy over the measures gave rise to the first major confrontation in the United States over the propriety and the constitutionality of ballot-box legislation, or referendums. Opponents of local option, which included drinkers and liquor dealers, many of whom were immigrants, argued that local option authorized the "tyranny of the majority" and infringed upon the rights of the liquor-dealing and liquor-consuming minority.

Local option, as a method of alcohol control, made a resurgence after the Civil War. The Anti-Saloon League initially decided to use local option as the mechanism to bring about nationwide prohibition. Its intent was to work across the country at the local level. In many instances, however, it was not the agenda. For instance, several wards in Ontario, Canada, passed local option but were vehemently against province-wide prohibition since they preferred to isolate alcohol sales, rather than ban them altogether. That is particularly evident in Toronto's Junction neighbourhood, part of which remained dry as late as 2000, the last area of Ontario to repeal prohibition.

Following the repeal of federal Prohibition in the United States in 1933, some states chose to maintain prohibition within their own borders. Others chose to permit local option on the controversial issue. In the remainder of states, there was no prohibition. Overlying the patchwork of prohibition, many states (known as alcoholic beverage control states) decided to establish their own monopolies over the wholesaling and/or retailing of alcoholic beverages. Montgomery County, Maryland, for example, has used local option to establish its alcohol control monopoly within its borders.

== Face masks ==
As a result of the COVID-19 pandemic some states in the United States of America, such as Georgia, implemented local option to control laws about public mask wearing enforcement.

== See also ==
- Local option sales tax
- School Infrastructure Local Option
