= Gene Winstead =

American politician and businessman

12th Mayor of Bloomington, Minnesota
- In office January 2, 2000 – January 2, 2020
- Preceded by: Coral Houle
- Succeeded by: Tim Busse

Personal details
- Born: 1951 (age 74–75) Minneapolis, Minnesota, U.S.
- Party: Republican
- Children: 3

Gene Winstead (born 1951) is an American politician and businessman from Minnesota. Winstead was first elected Mayor of Bloomington, Minnesota in 2000. He had previously served as a city council member for 5 years. His 20-year tenure as mayor is the longest in Bloomington history.

== Early life ==
Gene Winstead was raised in south Minneapolis by his two parents. He worked as a paperboy during his teenage years. His first foray into politics occurred when he attempted to convince the US government to get rid of the paper dollar bill and switch to coin dollars. During his efforts, he visited the offices of US Senators John McCain and Ted Kennedy. He still maintains this view saying "Practically, there should be no penny, and no dollar bill. They cost more than they’re worth". In 1975, he moved to Bloomington with his wife. He then started a career in the coin-operated gaming industry. It was when he moved his business to Lyndale Avenue in Bloomington that first got him connected with local government. He also started working at Lieberman Companies in 1980 and eventually reached the position of Vice President of Operations before retiring in 2004. Another business venture of his was the founding of the restaurant Ike's Food and Cocktail located in Bloomington and later expanded the restaurant to three other Minnesota locations.

== Political career ==
Prior to becoming an elected official, Gene Winstead was a member of a number of boards and commissions. He joined the Bloomington Crime Prevention Association and the Oxboro Planning Advisory Committee. He was appointed to the city's Planning Commission in 1986. He then transitioned to positions on the city's Housing and Redevelopment Authority and later the Metropolitan Council. He has also served on the Bloomington Port Authority, the Bloomington Convention and Visitors Bureau, Bloomington United for Youth, and the Bloomington Chamber of Commerce throughout his career.

Gene Winstead's first major political experience occurred in 1992 when he was chairman of the city's Planning Commission as the Mall of America opened in Bloomington. This has been a major success to the economy of Bloomington, as it is the largest employer in the city with over 11,000 jobs and makes up 10% of the city's tax base. Additionally, tourists spend $1 billion annually outside of the Mall resulting in additional tax revenue. The city estimates that the Mall generates four times the tax revenue that an alternative development would.

Winstead then entered public office after being appointed to one of the at-large council member seats in Bloomington on February 21, 1995, after mayor Neil Peterson resigned and council member Coral Houle was appointed mayor. He was then re-elected as council member in November 1995. He was first elected to mayor in 1999 after many people in the community encouraged him to run. He was subsequently elected 4 more times for a total of 20 years, the most of any Bloomington mayor. He was a relatively popular mayor, winning at least 65% of the vote in each election. However he was first elected with 76% of the vote and he lost votes each election after his first re-election in 2003 when he won 80% of the vote.

During his time as mayor, Winstead oversaw many major projects and accomplishments. In 2000, the city was awarded the highest bond rating from both Standard and Poor's and Moody's, a rating they maintained throughout his tenure. In 2002, the city's water treatment plant was renovated at a cost of $14.9 million along with the construction of a $8.5 million public works facility and the $3.6 million Bloomington Family Aquatic Center, an outdoor public swimming pool. In 2003, a new city hall was built at a cost of $46 million. In 2004, the first light rail line in Minnesota, the Blue Line was created with four stops in Bloomington. In 2007, the Bloomington Farmer's Market debuted. In 2009, Bloomington adopted an Alternative Transportation Plan, which intended to increase the amount of walking and biking in the city. In 2013, he ended a 20-year debate by finalizing a $12.9 million project to fix the historic Old Cedar Avenue Bridge and turn it into a walking and biking bridge. In 2016, he approved city-wide organized garbage collection. He also oversaw the expansion of the South Loop District, a neighborhood next to the Mall of America. Additionally, the overall real estate market value in the city increased from $7.8 billion in 2001 to $14.6 billion in 2019. Other projects he influenced include the planned construction of the Metro Orange Line that will travel through Bloomington, the expansion of the Mall of America, a focus on affordable housing, a smoking ban in city facilities, park improvements, and an attempt to bring the World's Fair to Bloomington.

Prior to the 2019 election, Winstead announced he would not seek a 6th term. His primary reason for not seeking re-election was that he felt his 35 years of public service was enough describing his time in public office and decision by saying "It has been great, but it’s time". He cited wanting to spend more time with his grandchildren and golf more as additional reasons for stepping down. As a result, five candidates filed for office and council member Tim Busse, who Winstead endorsed, was elected. Upon leaving office he stated "I want to kick back, but I don't plan on folding up anytime soon. When asked why he never ran for a higher office, he said “I never had aspirations to be that kind of politician”. In fact he often doesn't consider himself to be a politician but instead as a part of a governance team as he doesn't believe his decisions aligned with a specific party.
