= Neil W. Peterson =

Minnesota politician

10th Mayor of Bloomington, Minnesota
- In office January 2, 1990 – January 3, 1995
- Preceded by: Kurt Laughinghouse
- Succeeded by: Coral Houle

Personal details
- Born: Broken Bow, Nebraska, U.S.
- Party: Republican
- Children: 3

Neil W. Peterson was an American politician who served as the tenth Mayor of Bloomington, Minnesota.

== Political career ==
In 1978, Peterson was elected to the Bloomington City Council, serving four terms. He was elected Mayor of Bloomington in 1990 and was reelected in 1992 and 1994. While Mayor, the city passed an ordinance banning the sale of tobacco products via vending machines in 1991. In 1992, the Mall of America opened. In 1994, the city opened its official website. He resigned in 1995 to take up the position on the Metropolitan Council. In 2005, He was elected to represent Hennepin County in the House of Representatives of the state of Minnesota. He served two terms being in office there from 2005 to 2008. He retired in 2008.

== Education ==
Peterson graduated from Grand Isle High School in Nebraska. He then attended Hastings College, Nebraska, with a degree in economics. He later went to attend graduate school at Rutgers University and Stonier Graduate School, both in New Jersey.
