= Donaldson Company =

American manufacturing company

Donaldson Company, Inc.
- Type: Public
- Traded as: NYSE: DCI; S&P 400 Component
- Industry: Filtration Engines; Membranes Gas Turbines; Valves Hydraulics
- Founded: 1915
- Headquarters: Bloomington, Minnesota, U.S.
- Key people: Tod E. Carpenter Chief Executive Officer, President and Director; Scott Robinson, Chief Financial Officer
- Revenue: $2220.3 mil ▼6.4% 2016 FY
- Operating income: $274.2 mil ▼4.9% 2016 FY
- Net income: $190.8 ▼8.3% 2016 FY
- Total assets: $1.7886 bil (July 2016)
- Number of employees: 11,700 (July 31, 2016)
- Divisions: Engine; Industrial
- Website: Donaldson Company

Donaldson Company, Inc. is a filtration company engaged in the production and marketing of filtration products used in a variety of industry sectors, including commercial/industrial (engines, exhausts, transmissions, vents in private vehicles, hydraulics), aerospace (helicopters, planes), chemical, alternative energy (windmills), food & beverage, and pharmaceuticals. Also the company's research division, located in Minneapolis, Minn., participated in defense-related projects for various military applications (see below).

As a multinational company it operates in Belgium, Mexico, China, UK, Czech Republic, Malaysia, Thailand, USA, South Africa, Russia, Japan, Italy, Germany and France. In fiscal year 2016 20.3% of sales came from business in the Asia-Pacific region (up from 19.9%), 28.5% from Europe (vs 28.3%) and 42.2% from the US (42.5% in 2015). The company also makes aftermarket parts.

There was significant growth in the size of the company in terms of market value in 2009, going from about $2 billion at the start of the year to $3.26 billion in May 2010. Although sales were steady between 2007 and 2010 long term debt rose 98.6% over that period; Long term debt increased 44% in 2008 and remained near that level until January 2011 when it fell 17% quarter to quarter (then fell a further 3% by January 2012). No single customer contributes more than 10% of revenue.

The company has been recognized for innovations made in air filter technology (since 2008 annual spending on research and development has exceeded $40.6 million). It has also participated in technological advancements associated with fuel cells.

== Defense-related studies ==
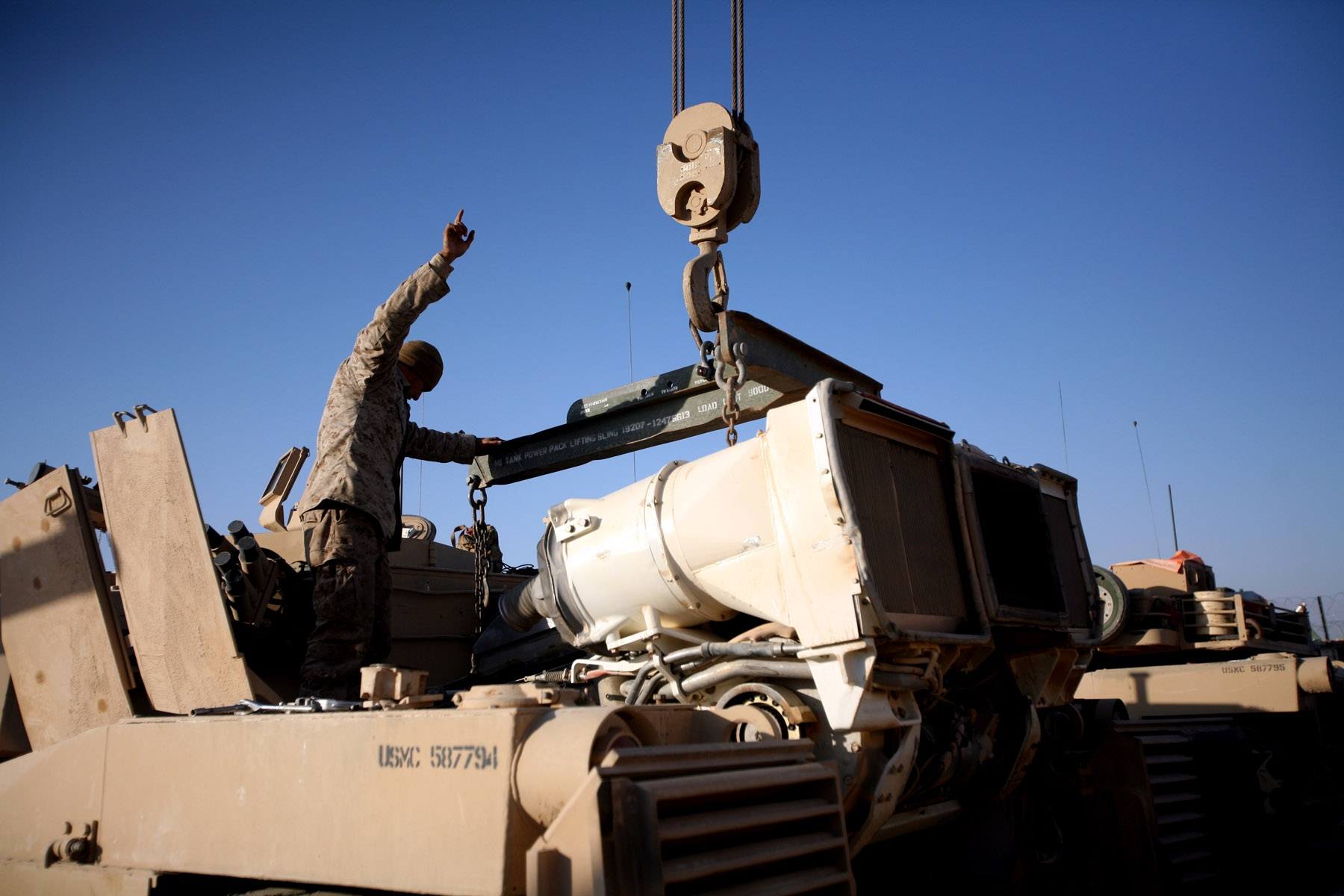
Donaldson-developed air filtration subsystem of AGT-1500 engine turbine

Since the early Cold War years, the company's research division has continuously participated in government-funded research projects for various military applications. Its focus mainly being on advanced development of modularized, collective protection for military vehicles, vans and shelters, nuclear, biological and chemical protection, development of CBRN defense systems (primarily for detection and warning of chemically contaminated environment, air and/or surface decontamination equipment,) for combat vehicles and manpower in the field, intended for use with all military branches of the United States Armed Forces, air filtration systems for missile systems and space vehicles, M1 Abrams main battle tank turbine engines, and complex military equipment such as the AN/TPQ-36 and AN/TPQ-37 Firefinder radars. Donaldson-developed chemical defensive material includes protective clothing and equipment to secure area and enclosures/compartments from chemical contamination, protect military personnel and individual soldiers from chemical agents; collective protection shelters for certain military headquarters and military communications functions, for rest and relief, and for certain vehicle crews; manual and automatic detection and warning devices that respond to toxic agents on all surfaces, in the atmosphere, and in food and water; means to decontaminate skin, clothing, equipment, terrain, food, and water.

== History ==
Started as Donaldson Engineering, a small business built around Frank Donaldson's air intake filter invention (engine air cleaner). Frank Donaldson invented the air intake filter while repairing a tractor in Utah. The business was incorporated in 1915 by Donaldson, his parents and his siblings as Donaldson Company Inc.

In its first decade, Donaldson Company made two important moves; it acquired the Wilcox-Bennet air filter license and introduced the Simplex, a filter that also prevents engine damage. Deere & Company was the company's most important client during the first couple decades. The early 1930s brought additional prosperity when William Lowther joined the company and designed the NS Filter, a tractor performance enhancing filter invented by Frank Donaldson. The 1930’s were a transitional period, beginning with tough economic conditions in the United States which caused business from farmers to fall and subsequently forcing the company to contract in size. This was later followed by the sale of patents to influential investors provided the company with funds and market exposure needed to survive and grow (part of the agreement was that Donaldson Company produce the filters). World War II provided opportunities for the company to expand into aerospace and military hydraulic equipment and device filters. The 1950s were bittersweet. While the company gained market share, grew in size and went public in 1955, it was beset by employee strikes, the exodus of key employees (who started a new company to compete with Donaldson for market share) and IRS charges of hidden back taxes.

In the 1960s subsidiaries were established in Germany, South Africa, Britain, France, Australia and Benelux.

Key dates and events

- 1915 - Frank Donaldson and his father, W.H.L. Donaldson, found Donaldson Engineering Company to market an air filter that the son has designed
- 1918 - The business is incorporated as Donaldson Company, Inc
- 1938 - First production facility abroad (Canada)
- 1942 - Frank Donaldson died, with his eldest son Frank jr. age 22.
- 1951 - Frank Donaldson Jr. became president of Donaldson Company
- 1960 - International expansion
- 1973 - Acquired Torit Corp. and Majac Inc. (both involved in air dust filtration)
- 1975 - New hydraulic fluid filtration system created
- 1984 - Forced to enter new markets (through acquisitions) and restructure due to recessionary effects on major customers like John Deere Tractor Company
- 1996 - Acquired French muffler maker Tecnov
- 1997 - Launched Donaldson Korea Company
- 1999 - Began producing in China (computer disk drive) and purchased AirMaze Corp for $31.9 million
- 2000 - Acquired England-based company DCE dust control for $56.4 million
- 2002 - Acquired industrial parts maker Ultrafilter International AG for $68 million. Ultrafilter had sales of $100 million and operated in 30 countries.
- 2007 - Purchased outright Aerospace Filtration Systems a company that had 18 million in sales the year before. Made a distribution agreement with Kaman Industrial Technologies.
- 2004 - Opened a new facility in Czech Republic, Klasterec nad Ohri
- 2015 - Opened new, state-of-the-art facilities in Skarbimierz, Poland and Bogota and Cartagena Colombia

== Divisions and Subsidiaries ==
Subsidiaries are grouped based on the products they deal in (engine, industrial, aerospace or pharmaceutical applications), with the two core business segments being Engine Products and Industrial Products.

Products in the Engine Products segment consist of air filtration systems, exhaust and emissions systems, liquid filtration systems including hydraulics, fuel, and lube systems, and replacement filters. The Engine Products segment sells to original equipment manufacturers (OEMs) in the construction, mining, agriculture, aerospace, defense, and truck markets, and to independent distributors, OEM dealer networks, private label accounts, and large equipment fleets.

Products in the Industrial Products segment consist of dust, fume, and mist collectors, compressed air purification systems, air filtration systems for gas turbines, PTFE membrane-based products, and specialized air and gas filtration systems for applications including computer hard disk drives and semiconductor manufacturing. The Industrial Products segment sells to various industrial dealers, distributors, OEMs of gas-fired turbines, and OEMs and end-users requiring clean filtration solutions and replacement filters.

The company delivered revenue of $2.4 billion in fiscal year 2015 (compared to $2.5 billion in fiscal year 2014) through its diversified portfolio of engine and industrial filtration products, with roughly 60% of total sales being generated outside of the US. Donaldson operates a network of approximately 140 sales, manufacturing and distribution locations in 44 countries across the world.

Donaldson silencers were used for reducing venting noise levels in the Deaerator equipment industry in the 1980s and 1990s. The Engine Products segment contributed to 63% of total net sales and Industrial Products segment contributed 37%. Aftermarket Products in the Engine segment made up 41% of total net sales. These percentages were the same in both 2016 and 2015.

In November 2021, Donaldson Company acquired Italy-based Solaris Biotechnology Slr for more than $46 million.

== Awards ==
2014 - Master of Quality Award from Daimler Trucks North America (DTNA)

2015, 2016 - Award for Aftermarket Excellence by Volvo Group Purchasing in consecutive years
