= Bloomington Historical Society =

Historical society in Bloomington, Minnesota, U.S.

- Location: 10200 Penn Ave S, Bloomington, MN 55431
- Coordinates: 44.81894568919423°N 93.3091476017846°W
- Type: Local History

Bloomington Historical Society is a historical society in Bloomington, Minnesota, devoted to preserving and sharing the local history of Bloomington.

== Museum ==
Bloomington Historical Society has operated its museum in Bloomington's Historic Old Town Hall since 1964, located at the intersection of Penn Avenue and Old Shakopee Road. Its museum collection contains various artifacts and exhibits; notable exhibits include an exhibit on Oak Grove Presbyterian Church, a Presbyterian church that was located where Bloomington Cemetery is now, and one on historic newspapers of the city such as the Bloomitarian, the Sun Suburbanite, the Bloomington News, the Richfield Bloomington Sun, and the Bloomington Sun. Some other notable exhibits include World War I artifacts from Bloomington men and women who served in the war as well as artifacts from the Gideon and Agnes Pond family.
