= United Christian Academy =

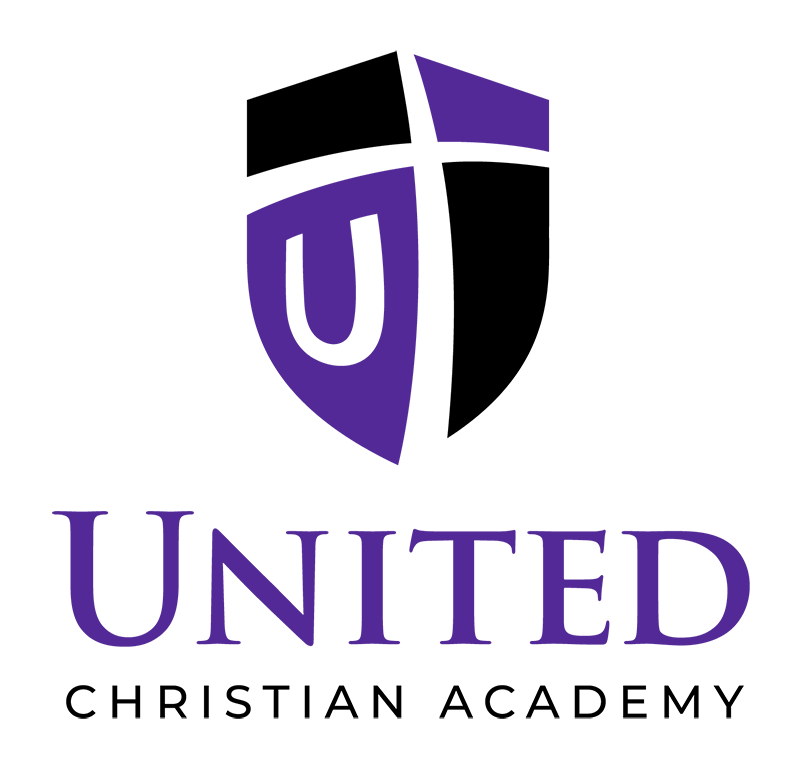

Location
- 8600 Bloomington Avenue South; Bloomington Minnesota; 55437; United States
- Coordinates: 44.8267355°N 93.3348810°W

Information
- Former names: Life Academy, Christian Life, and Bethany Academy
- School type: Interdenominational Private Private
- Religious affiliation: Christian
- Established: 2019
- Dean: Shelly Strand
- Head of school: Chad Peters (interim)
- Faculty: 34
- Grades: PreK-12
- Campus size: 22,777.58 m²
- Colors: Purple and Black
- Athletics: Soccer, volleyball, basketball, cheerleading, baseball, softball
- Athletics conference: Minnesota State High School League
- Mascot: Thunder
- Nickname: UCA
- Team name: UCA Thunder
- National ranking: 1. 967 of 1,138
- Affiliation: SRa (Sperides Reiners Architects, Inc.), Loeffler Construction & Consulting
- Website: www.ucathunder.org

United Christian Academy (UCA) is a private, interdenominational Christian school for students in Pre-K through 12th grade. Founded in 2019, United Christian Academy was merged from Christian Life Academy of Farmington, Minnesota, Bethany Academy, and Life Academy of Bloomington.

United Christian Academy is currently located in Bloomington, Minnesota, at Cedar Valley Church. UCA is also planning on building a new campus in Lakeville, MN.
