= Bush Lake (Hennepin County, Minnesota) =

Lake in the state of Minnesota, United States

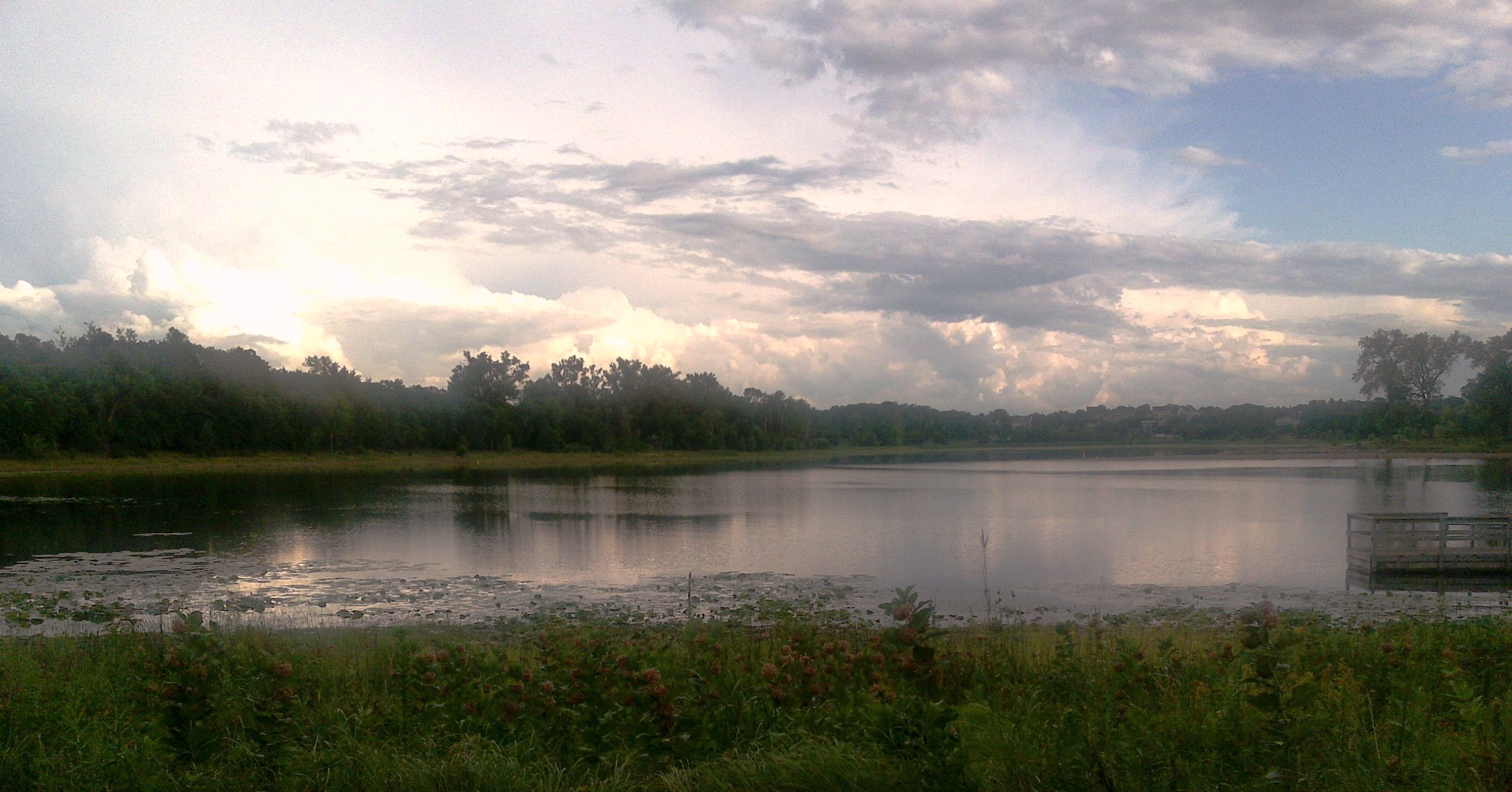

- Location within Minnesota
- Location: Bloomington, Minnesota, U.S.
- Coordinates: 44°50′13″N 93°22′56″W
- Basin countries: United States
- Surface area: 172.2 acres (69.7 ha)
- Max. depth: 28.0 ft (8.5 m)
- Settlements: Bloomington, Minnesota

Bush Lake is located in the southwest corner of the Minneapolis suburb of Bloomington, Minnesota, near its border with Eden Prairie in Hennepin County. It has an area of 172.2 acres (69.7 ha) and a maximum depth of 28.0 feet (8.5 m). The lake contains many fish, but primarily Bluegill, Northern Pike, Pumpkinseed Sunfish, Yellow Bullhead, Yellow Perch. The Lake is considered mesotrophic.

Bush Lake is near Hyland Lake Park Reserve.

== History ==
When European settlement of the area began in the mid-19th century, the contemporary Bush Lake water body was a bay in Andersons Lake, now an interconnected series of lakes (each of which are also former bays) called the Anderson Lakes. By as early as 1890, there existed a distinct water body referred to as Bush Lake.

== Recreational Facilities ==
Bush Lake is a popular destination in the summer for recreation. The facilities are split between 2 parks, one on the east side of the lake and the other on the west side. Beach and swimming access is from East Bush Lake Park while canoe and boat access is from West Bush Lake Park. West Bush Lake Park also offers canoe and kayak storage. Additionally, both parks offer public restrooms, picnic shelters, fishing piers, volleyball courts, and playgrounds. A multi-use path connects the two parks along the southern edge of the lake. In the past, a daily parking fee was required for users parking at East Bush Lake Park during the summer but since 2020, it has been free for all users. While boats are allowed on Bush Lake, motors are limited to 6 horsepower.

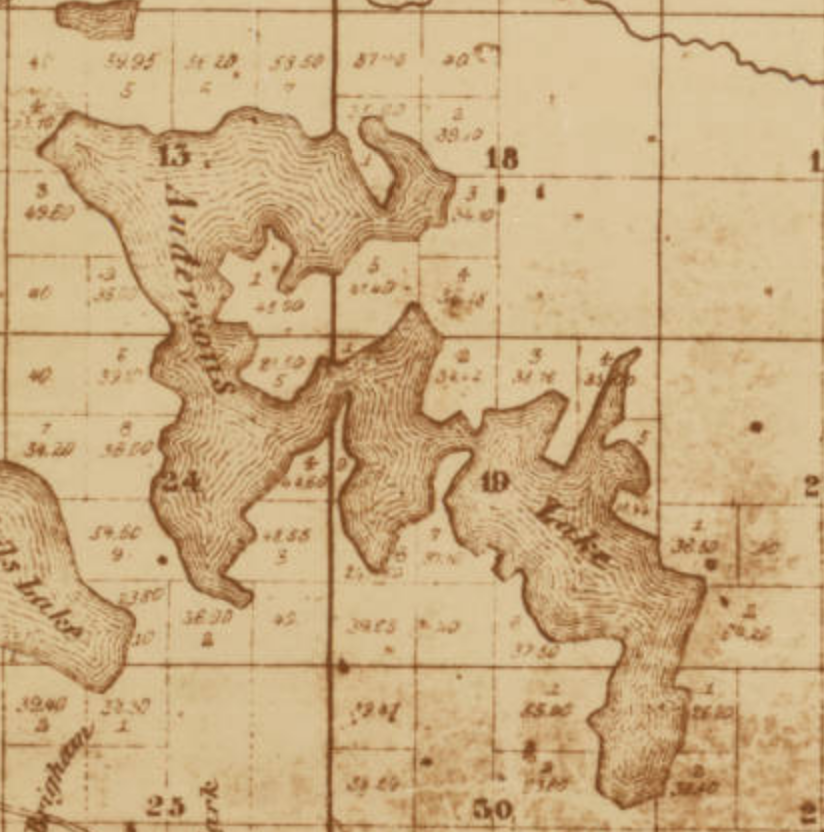
The contemporary Bush Lake as a bay on Andersons Lake (now the Anderson Lakes chain) in 1860.
