= William Belanger =

American politician and businessman

Member of the Minnesota State Senate
- In office January 6, 1981 – January 2, 2007
- Succeeded by: John Doll

Personal details
- Born: October 18, 1928 Minneapolis, Minnesota, U.S.
- Died: December 28, 2018 (aged 90) Bloomington, Minnesota, U.S.
- Party: Republican
- Occupation: Senior Program Planner, Honeywell Defense Systems employee

William Victor "Bill" Belanger Jr. (October 18, 1928 – December 28, 2018) was an American politician and businessman in the state of Minnesota.

== Biography ==
Belanger was born in Minneapolis, Minnesota and graduated from the DeLaSalle High School in Minneapolis. Belanger served in the United States Army in 1946–1947 and during the Korean War. He graduated from the University of St. Thomas. Belanger worked at Honeywell Defense Systems. Belanger served on the Bloomington, Minnesota city council from 1966 to 1977 and as vice-mayor of Bloomington. Belanger also served on the Bloomington Housing and Redevelopment Authority Commission. He was a Minnesota state senator from District 38 from 1981 to 1982, District 41 from 1982 to 2002, and District 40 from 2003 to 2006. He previously ran for the State Senate in 1976, but lost the general election to Robert M. Benedict. He was married with seven children. Belanger died in Bloomington, Minnesota on December 28, 2018.

Minnesota Senate
Preceded by Robert M. Benedict	Member of the Minnesota Senate from the 38th district 1981–1983	Succeeded by Howard A. Knutson
Preceded by Irving Stern	Member of the Minnesota Senate from the 41st district 1983–2003	Succeeded by Geoff Michel
Preceded by Dave Johnson	Member of the Minnesota Senate from the 40th district 2003–2007	Succeeded by John P. Doll
