= Lieberman Companies =

Lieberman Companies is a distributor and certified ISO processor of ATMs, amusement route operator, and owns Elsie's Place gaming cafes in Illinois. Based in Bloomington, Minnesota, the company has been family-owned since its inception in 1907.

Samuel Lieberman, a Lithuanian immigrant to Minnesota, started the company in 1907. It was a small business servicing coin-operated machines in bars and restaurants. After Samuel died in 1938, his son Harold formed Lieberman Music Company, a jukebox distributor. An additional division called Viking Vending distributed food and drink machines.

Fourth generation owners Hal Lieberman and Dan Lieberman currently operate the business.

Lieberman is an authorized automated teller machine (ATM) Independent Service Organization (ISO) with RBS WorldPay. In 2010, Lieberman Companies was named a Top Ten Distributor of ATMs by Payment Alliance International (PAI), a provider of electronic payment processing solutions. In addition to the ATM business, Lieberman Companies operates a 275-customer amusement route in the Minneapolis/St. Paul area called American Amusement Arcades. The company also owns and operates all Elsie's Place gaming cafes in the Chicago area. The first Elsie's Place opened in Worth, Illinois in May 2014.

The company also has a history in other industries. Lieberman Enterprises was the second largest distributor of music and movies in the United States in the 1980s and early 1990s. The company was publicly traded on the NASDAQ (LMAN).

Lieberman Companies was involved in the restaurant business starting in an arcade at Southdale Center. Carousel Snack Bars became a 270-unit national operator of restaurants under the A&W brand name. A&W Restaurants purchased the company in 1997.

Mazzco, a replacement parts company, was purchased by Lieberman Companies in 1994 and sold in 2006.

Lieberman Companies is currently active in Cleantech investing under the leadership of Dan Lieberman. He has been a judge in The Minnesota Cup business plan contest and leads the Environment Network of Young Presidents' Organization (YPO).

In January 2016, American Vending Sales acquired Lieberman Companies' amusement and vending distribution business.

In July 2019, Lieberman Companies moved to a new space at 9361 Penn Ave South in Bloomington, Minnesota.

In November 2022, Lieberman Companies acquired D&R Star's amusement and ATM route in southeastern Minnesota. D&R continues to operate from their Rochester facility.
