= Bloomington Old Town Hall =

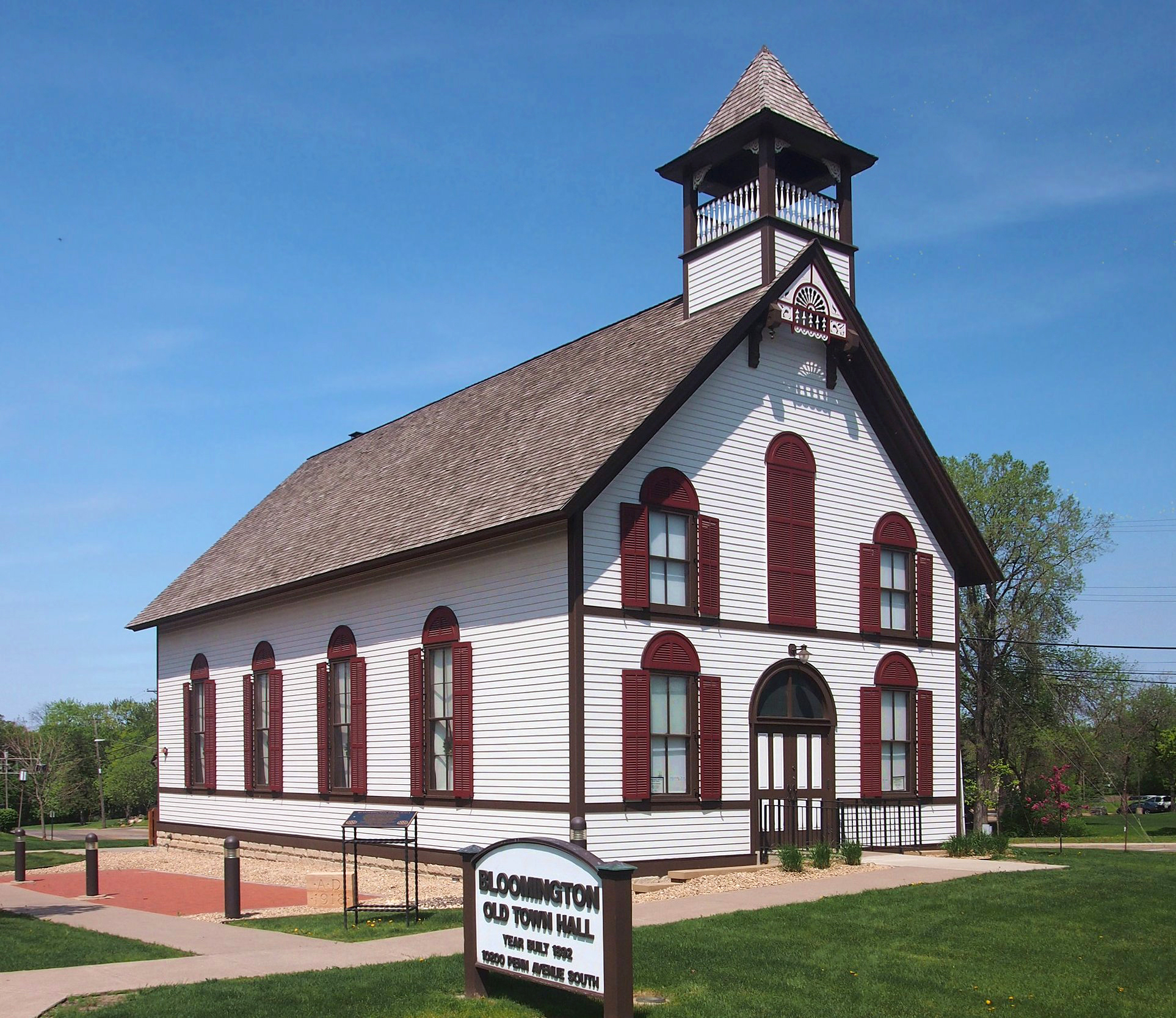
- Historic Bloomington Old Town Hall Museum

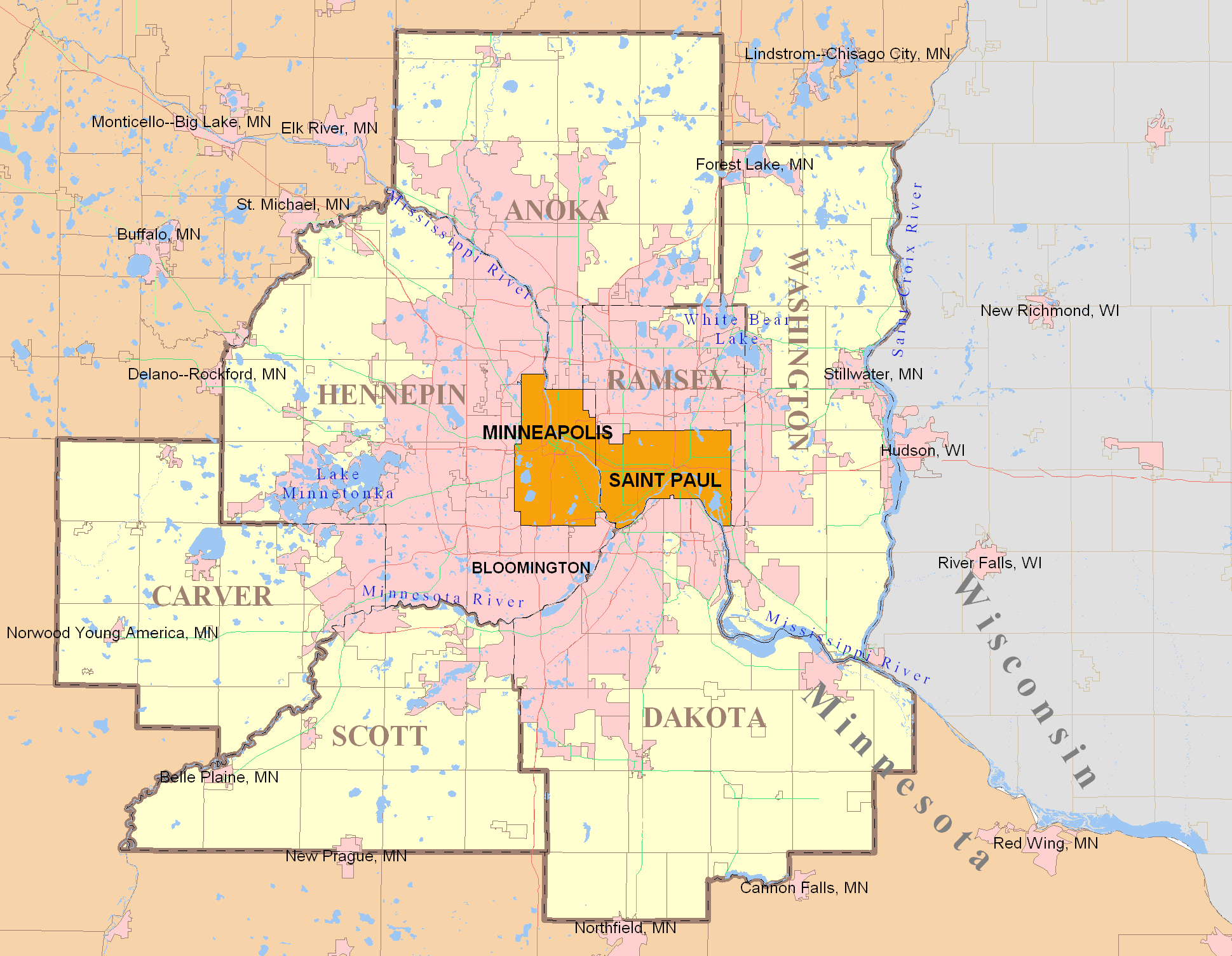
- Location within Minneapolis–Saint Paul

General information
- Location: Minnesota
- Coordinates: 44.81893536903154°N 93.30914108667906°W

Bloomington Old Town Hall is a historic town hall located in Bloomington, Minnesota. It was built in 1892 and is designated as a Class I historic site by the City of Bloomington. It originally housed the Bloomington Town Board, then later the Village Council and eventually the Bloomington City Council as well as the city offices of Bloomington until 1964. Today, the "Old Town Hall" functions as a museum for the Bloomington Historical Society, offering tours that display settlement-era artifacts, military artifacts, and exhibits highlighting important events of Bloomington history.

== Renovations ==
Bloomington's Old Town Hall has had two major renovations since its completion in 1892: once in the 1920s and another from 2007–2008. In the 1920s, the town decided to relocate the town hall 20 feet from its original site to accommodate a basement. In 2007-2008, a restoration project was completed on the building and improved various aspects of the architecture, such as the interior floor being refurbished and the renewing of the original windows.
