= Local option sales tax =

In the United States, a local option sales tax (often abbreviated LOST) is a special-purpose local option tax implemented and levied at the city or county level. A local option sales tax is often used as a means of raising funds for specific local or area projects, such as improving area streets and roads, or refurbishing a community's downtown area.

LOSTs are always appended onto a state's base sales tax rate, most commonly at a rate of 1%. For example, in Iowa, the base sales tax rate is 6% statewide, or six cents per dollar. If a city or county in Iowa were to implement a local option sales tax, this would result in a 7% sales tax rate, or seven cents per dollar. Since a LOST is implemented at city or county level, they apply only within the city or county in which it was implemented. Using the Iowa example, this means that any neighboring cities or counties would remain at 6% sales tax, unless they implement their own LOST.

A LOST most often (if not always) requires a passing vote by the general public before they can be implemented. Once implemented, a LOST is often levied for only temporary time periods, such as five years. As the expiration date approaches, another vote may be presented to the public, giving the options of either extending the LOST (for any other projects), or letting the LOST expire and discontinue.

Some states include multiple types of LOSTs depending on their intended purpose. For example, in Iowa, a standard LOST is used for city or county improvement purposes, whereas a SILO (School Infrastructure Local Option) tax is often used to build new schools, improve existing school buildings, or other educational purposes. Since a standard LOST and SILO are considered different types of taxes, regardless of them both being forms of local option sales taxes, it is possible for a city or county to implement both simultaneously (Using the Iowa example, this would yield an 8% sales tax within that city or county).
