= 2019 Bloomington, Minnesota municipal election =

- November 5, 2019

The 2019 Bloomington, Minnesota municipal elections were held on November 5, 2019. Bloomington's mayor was up for election, three city council seats, and three school board seats. There was one ballot question, relating to the sale of alcohol. All elections were held by the first past the post system.

== Mayor ==
Incumbent Gene Winstead was not seeking re-election to what would be his sixth term.

=== Filed ===
- Tim Busse, At-Large Councilmember
- Ryan Kulka, business owner

=== Results ===
Mayor results
Candidate
Candidate	Votes	%
Tim Busse	9,955	55.74%
Ryan Kulka	7,868	44.06%
Write-ins	36	0.20%
Total active votes	17,859	100.00
Source: Minnesota Secretary of State

== City Council ==
One At-Large seat was up for election, as were districts I and II were up for election.

=== At-Large ===
Incumbent Tim Busse was not seeking re-election, and was running for mayor.

==== Filed ====
- Brian Clemens, business owner
- Jenna Carter, Bloomington Housing Coalition member

=== Results ===
At-Large
Candidate
Candidate	Votes	%
Jenna Carter	10,718	61.75%
Brian Clemens	6,614	38.11%
Write-ins	24	0.14%
Total active votes	17,356	100.00
Source: Minnesota Secretary of State

=== District I ===
Incumbent Dwayne Lowman was seeking re-election.

==== Filed ====
- Dwayne Lowman, incumbent
- Al Noard

=== Results ===
District I
Candidate
Candidate	Votes	%
Dawyne Lowman (Incumbent)	2,521	56.84%
Al Noard	1,903	42.91%
Write-ins	11	0.25%
Total active votes	4,435	100.00
Source: Minnesota Secretary of State

=== District II ===
Incumbent Shawn Nelson was seeking re-election.

==== Filed ====
- Shawn Nelson, incumbent
- Susan ‘Hofmeister’ Woodruff

=== Results ===
District II
Candidate
Candidate	Votes	%
Shawn Nelson (Incumbent)	3,050	63.95%
Susan ‘Hofmeister’ Woodruff	1,704	35.73%
Write-ins	15	0.31%
Total active votes	4,769	100.00
Source: Minnesota Secretary of State

== Ballot Question ==
=== Question ===
'Shall the Bloomington City Charter be amended to delete Section 12.12, which would allow the City Council to adopt ordinances authorizing additional types of places to serve and sell alcohol in the City?'

Ballot Question
Candidate
Candidate	Votes	%
Yes	13,602	77.27%
No	4,002	22.73%
Total active votes	17,604	100.00
Source: Minnesota Secretary of State

== School Board ==
Three school board seats were up for election.

=== Filed ===
- Heather Starks, Teacher
- John Moravec
- Maureen Bartolotta, Incumbent
- Mia Olson, Substitute Teacher
- Nelly Korman, Incumbent
- Scott Christensen

=== Results ===
School board
Candidate
Candidate	Votes	%
Nelly Korman (Incumbent)	9,015	21.80%
Heather Starks	8,674	20.98%
Mia Olson	7,474	18.08%
John Moravec	7,387	17.87%
Maureen Bartolotta (Incumbent)	5,496	13.29%
Scott Christensen	3,153	7.63%
Write-In	145	0.35%
Total Ballots Cast	41,614	100.00%
Source: Minnesota Secretary of State
