= Bloomington, Minnesota =

City in Minnesota, United States

- City
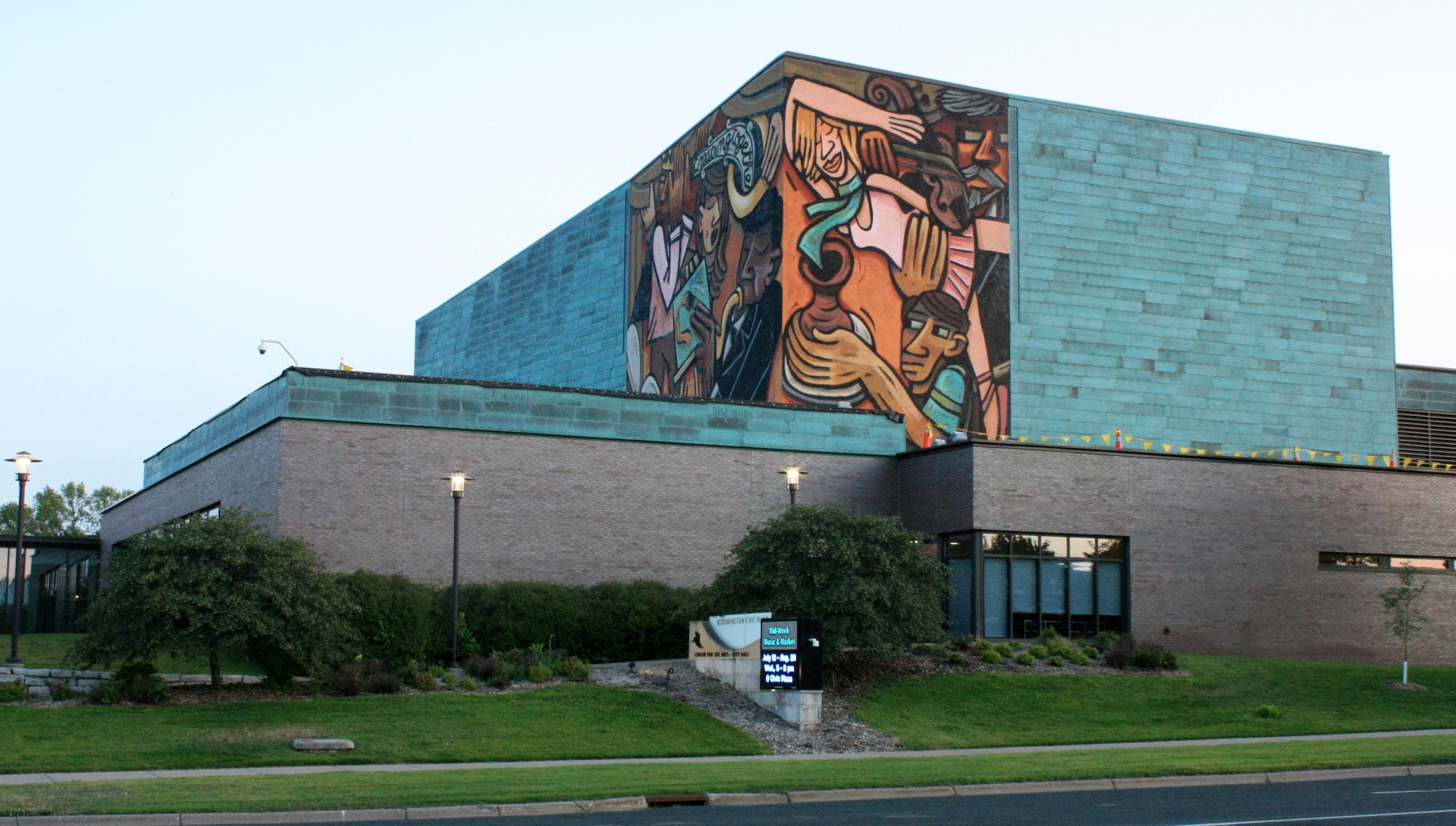
- Bloomington Civic Plaza, home to City Hall, the police station, and the Center for the Arts

- Flag

- Location of Bloomington within Hennepin County, Minnesota
- Coordinates: 44°50′27″N 93°17′54″W
- Country: United States
- State: Minnesota
- County: Hennepin
- Founded: 1843
- Incorporated (town): May 11, 1858
- Incorporated (city): November 8, 1960

Government
  - Type: Council-manager
  - Mayor: Tim Busse
  - City manager: Zach Walker

Area
  - City: 38.395 sq mi (99.443 km^{2})
  - Land: 34.699 sq mi (89.869 km^{2})
  - Water: 3.697 sq mi (9.574 km^{2}) 9.73%
- Elevation: 827 ft (252 m)

Population (2020)
  - City: 89,987
  - Estimate (2025): 89,034
  - Rank: US: 400th MN: 5th
  - Density: 2,518.7/sq mi (972.49/km^{2})
  - Metro: 3,712,020 (US: 16th)
- Time zone: UTC–6 (Central (CST))
  - Summer (DST): UTC–5 (CDT)
- ZIP Codes: 55420, 55425, 55431, 55435, 55437, 55438
- Area code: 952
- FIPS code: 27-06616
- Sales tax: 9.025%
- Website: bloomingtonmn.gov

Bloomington is a city in Hennepin County, Minnesota, United States. It is located on the north bank of the Minnesota River above its confluence with the Mississippi River, 10 miles (16 km) south of downtown Minneapolis and just south of the Interstate 494/694 Beltway. The population was 89,987 at the 2020 census, making it Minnesota's fourth-largest city, and the largest suburb of the Twin Cities.

Bloomington was established as a post–World War II housing boom suburb connected to Minneapolis's urban street grid, and is serviced by four major freeways: Interstate 35W running north–south through the approximate middle of the city, Minnesota State Highway 77, also signed as Cedar Avenue, running north–south near the eastern end of the city, U.S. Highway 169, running north–south along the western boundary of the city, and Interstate 494 running east–west at the northern border. Minnesota State Highway 100 also terminates within city limits at Interstate 494. Large-scale commercial development is concentrated along the I-494 corridor. Besides an extensive city park system, with over 1,000 square feet (93 m^{2}) of parkland per capita, Bloomington is also home to Hyland Lake Park Reserve in the west and Minnesota Valley National Wildlife Refuge in the southeast.

Bloomington has more jobs per capita than either Minneapolis or Saint Paul, due in part to the United States' largest enclosed shopping center, the Mall of America, which is located inside of the city. The mall has over 500 stores and contains an amusement park. The headquarters of Dayforce, Donaldson Company, Great Clips, Dairy Queen, HealthPartners, and Toro, and major operations of Pearson, General Dynamics, Seagate Technologies, and Express Scripts are also based in the city.

The city was named after Bloomington, Illinois.

== History ==
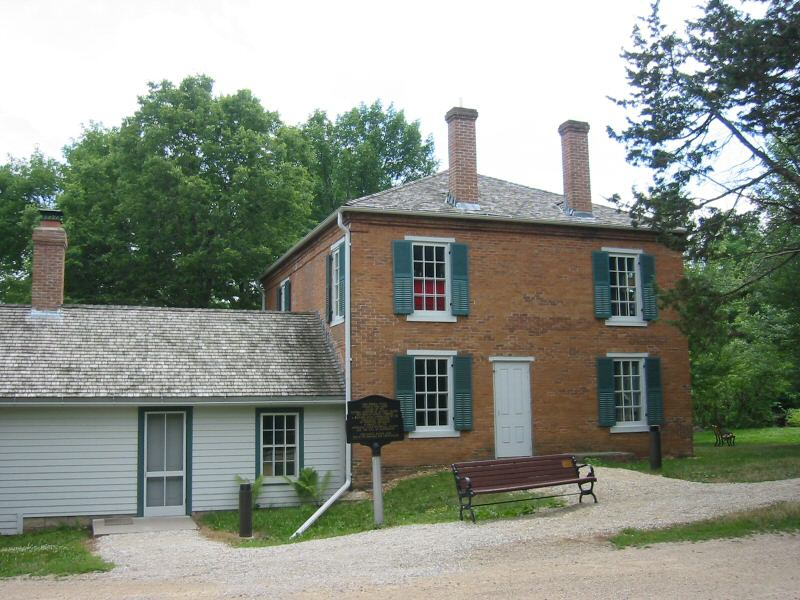
Built in 1856 on the bluffs of the Minnesota River, the Gideon H. Pond House is now listed in the National Register of Historic Places.

In the 1780s, a village called Titanka Tannina existed in what is now Bloomington, at the mouth of Nine Mile Creek. 'Titanka Tannina' is Dakota for 'the Old Village', likely meaning that Titanka Tannina was the first Dakota community on the Minnesota River. The Chief at that time was Penasha, who would be succeeded by his son, Takuni Phephe Sni. He would then be succeeded by his son, Good Road, in 1833.

In 1839, with renewed conflict with the Ojibwe nation, Chief Cloud Man relocated his band of the Mdewakanton Sioux from Bde Maka Ska in Minneapolis to an area named Oak Grove in southern Bloomington, close to present-day Portland Avenue. In 1843, Peter and Louisa Quinn, the first European settlers to live in Bloomington, built a cabin along the Minnesota River in the area. The government had sent them to teach the Native Americans European-derived farming methods. Gideon Hollister Pond, a missionary who had been following and recording the Dakota language from Cloud Man's band, relocated later that year, establishing Oak Grove Mission, his log cabin. Pond and his family held church services and taught the Dakota school subjects and Western farming. Passage across the Minnesota River in Bloomington came in 1849 when William Chambers and Joseph Dean opened the Bloomington Ferry. It remained operational until 1889, when the Bloomington Ferry Bridge was built.

After the Treaty of Traverse des Sioux in 1851, the territory west of the Mississippi River, including Bloomington, was opened to settlers. At this time, native Dakota villages such as Titanka Tannina were abandoned. A group of pioneers settled in Bloomington, including the Goodrich, Whalon, and Ames families. They named the area Bloomington after the city they were from, Bloomington, Illinois. Most early jobs were in farming, blacksmithing, and flour milling. The Oxborough family, who came from Canada, built a trading center on Lyndale Avenue and named it Oxboro Heath. Today, the Clover Shopping Center rests near the old trading center site and the nearby Oxboro Clinic is named after them. The Baliff family opened a grocery and general store at what is today Penn Avenue and Old Shakopee Road, and Hector Chadwick, after moving to the settlement, opened a blacksmith shop near the Bloomington Ferry. In 1855, the first public school for all children was opened in Miss Harrison's house, with the first school, Gibson House, built in 1859. On May 11, 1858, the day Minnesota was admitted into the union and officially became a state, 25 residents incorporated the Town of Bloomington. By 1880, the population had grown to 820. In 1892, the first town hall was built at Penn and Old Shakopee Road. By then, the closest Dakota to Minneapolis lived at the residence of Gideon Pond.

=== 1900s to 1930s ===
After 1900, the population surpassed 1,000 and Bloomington began to transform into a city. With rising population came conflict among citizens over social issues. Among the major issues during this period were parents' unwillingness to consolidate the individual schools into a single, larger school, and fear of mounting taxes. By 1900, there were six rural schools spread throughout the territory with over 200 students enrolled in grades first through eighth. In 1917, the school consolidation issue was settled when voters approved the consolidation. A year later, secondary education and school bus transportation began throughout the city. Telephone service and automobiles appeared.

=== 1940s to 1950s ===
From 1940 to 1960, the city's population increased to nine times that of the population at the turn of the century. During the 1940s, the city's development vision was low-cost, low-density housing, each with its own well and septic system. The rapid population growth was due in part to the post-World War II boom and subsequent birth of the baby boomer generation. In 1947, the first fire station was constructed and equipped at a cost of $24,000 and the Bloomington Volunteer Fire Department was established with 25 members.

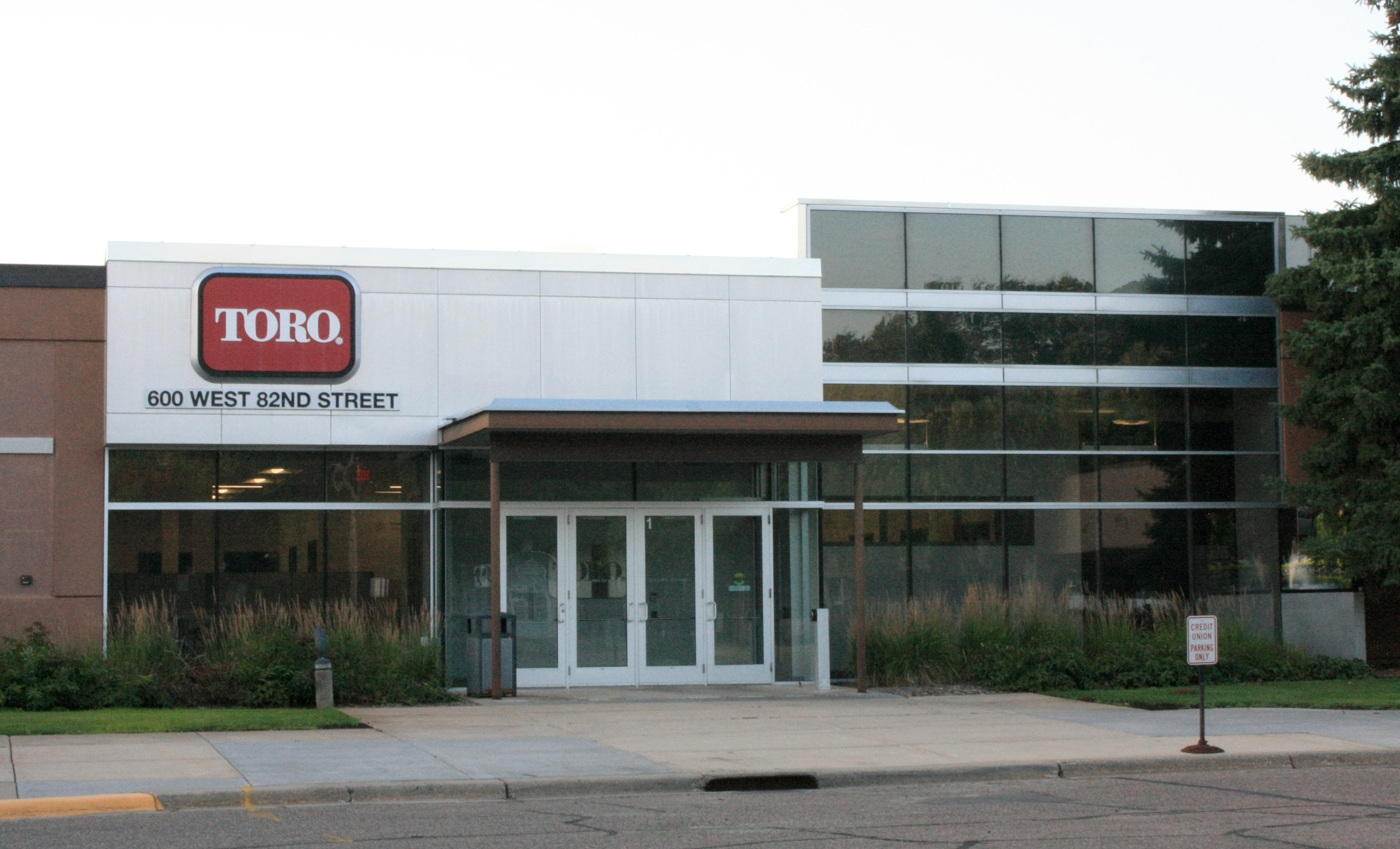
Toro moved to Bloomington in 1952

The 1950s saw a considerable expansion of the city and its infrastructure, with the city shifting away from its small-town atmosphere and feel. In 1950, because of the increasing population, the first elementary school, Cedarcrest, was built. It was evident that one consolidated school could no longer serve the growing population, and ten new schools were built in this decade to meet the need. In 1952, the first large business, Toro Manufacturing Company, moved to Bloomington. The significance of this can be seen in Bloomington today, which is home to hundreds of businesses of all types.

In 1953, Bloomington changed from a township to a village form of government. This more professional approach to government was accompanied by open council meetings, land use plans, and published budgets. The effects of this new form of government began immediately, first with the formation of the city police department (at a cost of $2 per taxpayer) and then with the first parkland acquisition. Both Bush Lake Beach and Moir Park were established at a cost of one dollar to each residence. Today, about 1/3 of the city's land area is devoted to city and regional parks, playgrounds, and open space. In 1956, the first city land-use plan was initiated with the construction of Interstate 35W and Metropolitan Stadium.

In 1957, Bloomington High School opened at West 88th Street and Sheridan Avenue South.

In 1958, the city changed from a village government to a council-manager form. One of the first policies the council adopted was encouragement of commercial and industrial development, low-cost housing, and shopping centers. Due to the rapid population increase during this time, police and fire departments changed to a 24-hour dispatching system, and the fire department (now with 46 members) converted a garage into the second fire station.

=== 1960s to 1970s ===
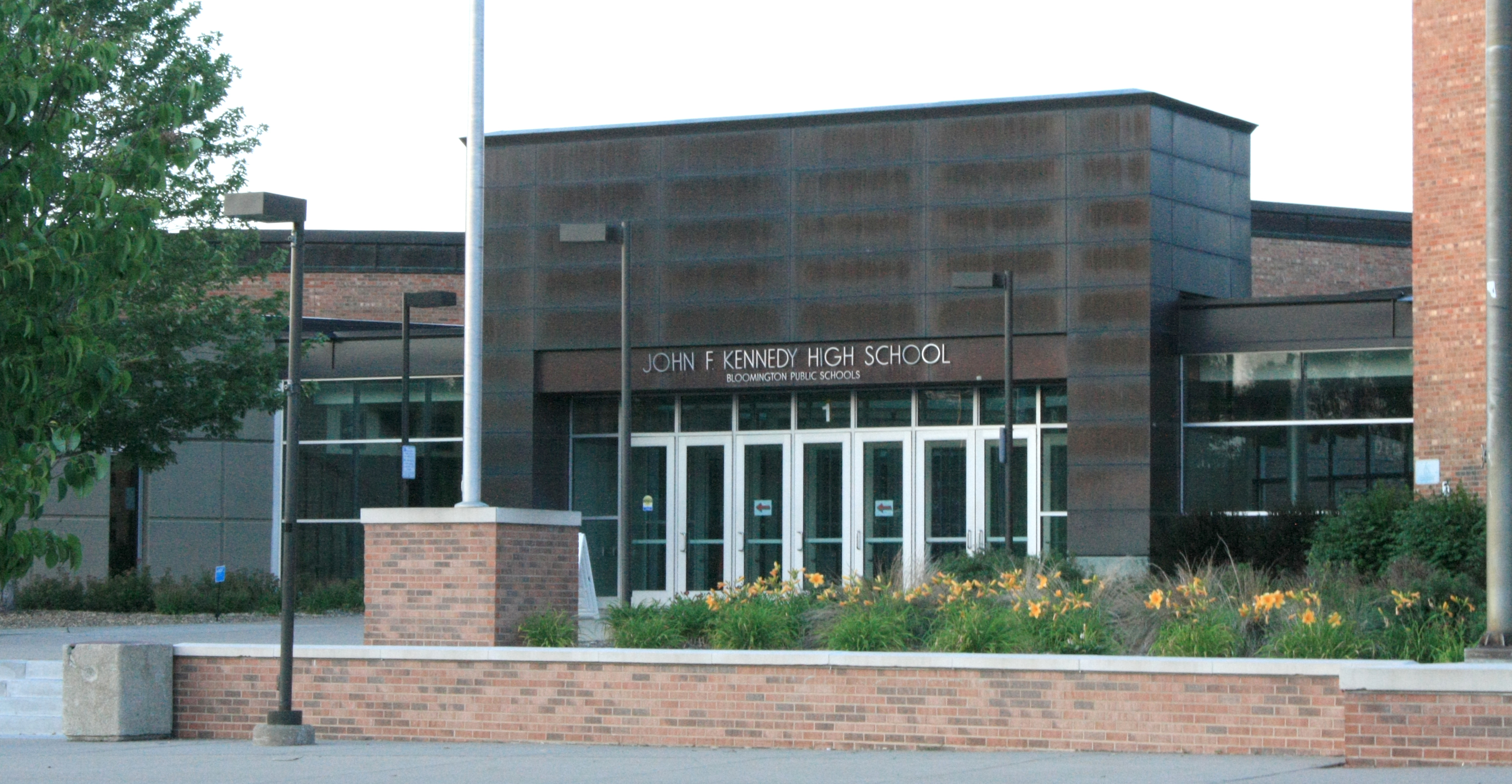
Bloomington Kennedy High School was built in 1965

The 1960s saw accelerated school and business growth throughout the city. On November 8, 1960, Bloomington officially became a city as voters approved the city's organizing document, the city charter. The charter provides for a council-manager form of government in which the city council exercises the city's legislative power and determines all city policies (see City of Bloomington Government). In 1965, a second high school, John F. Kennedy High School, was built, and Bloomington High School was renamed Abraham Lincoln High School. In 1967, a second and third official fire station were approved and built to more effectively combat fires in the increasingly large city. In 1968, Normandale State Junior College opened with an initial enrollment of 1,358 students. In 1974, it was renamed Normandale Community College to reflect expanded courses of study.

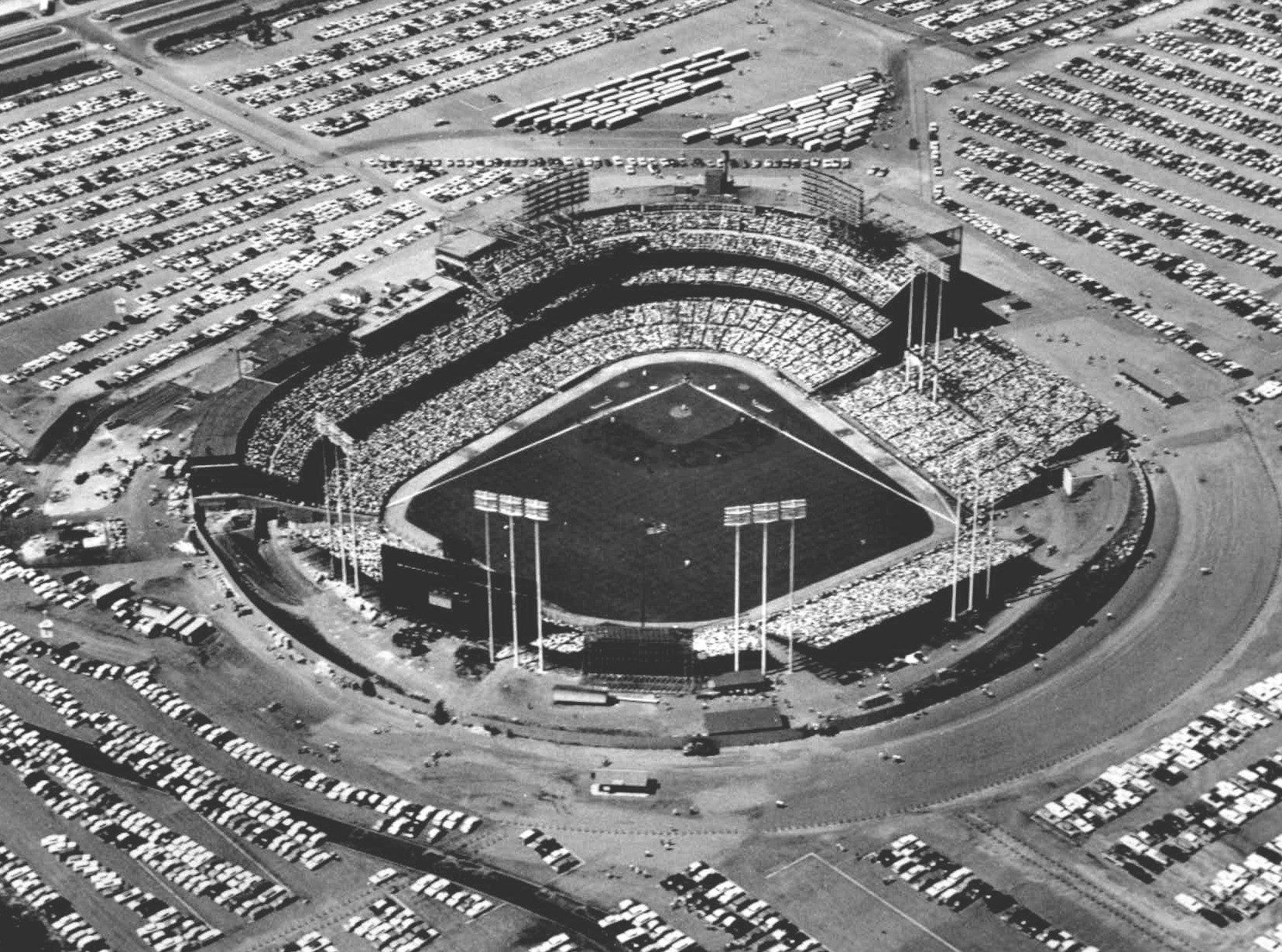
Owned by the City of Minneapolis but located in Bloomington, major league teams played at the Metropolitan Stadium from 1961 until 1981. It was demolished in 1985 to make room for the Mall of America.

From 1961 to 1981, Bloomington was home to most of Minnesota's major sports teams. In 1961, after the completion of Metropolitan Stadium in 1956, both the Minnesota Twins and Minnesota Vikings began regular-season play. Though originally built for the American Association Minneapolis Millers, a minor league baseball team, Metropolitan Stadium was renovated and expanded for Major League Baseball and the National Football League. The first Twins game was held on April 21 (Washington 5, Twins 3) and the first Vikings game was held on September 17 (Vikings 37, Chicago Bears 13). On August 21, 1965, The Beatles played Metropolitan Stadium, their only stop ever in the Minneapolis-St. Paul metropolitan area. In 1967, with the expansion of the National Hockey League, the Metropolitan Sports Center was built near Metropolitan Stadium and the Minnesota North Stars began play later that year.

A number of new city buildings were constructed in the 1970s. In 1970, Thomas Jefferson High School, Bloomington Ice Garden rink one, and a fourth fire station were built. In 1971, school enrollment peaked with 26,000 students, and the fire department had grown to a force of 105 men. (In 1974, after a six-hour city council meeting, women were allowed to join the Bloomington Fire Department, but the city's first female firefighter, Ann Majerus Meyer, did not join the department until 1984; she retired in 2013). In 1975, a second rink was added to the Bloomington Ice Garden and a fifth fire station built, with a sixth added in 1979.

=== 1980s to present ===
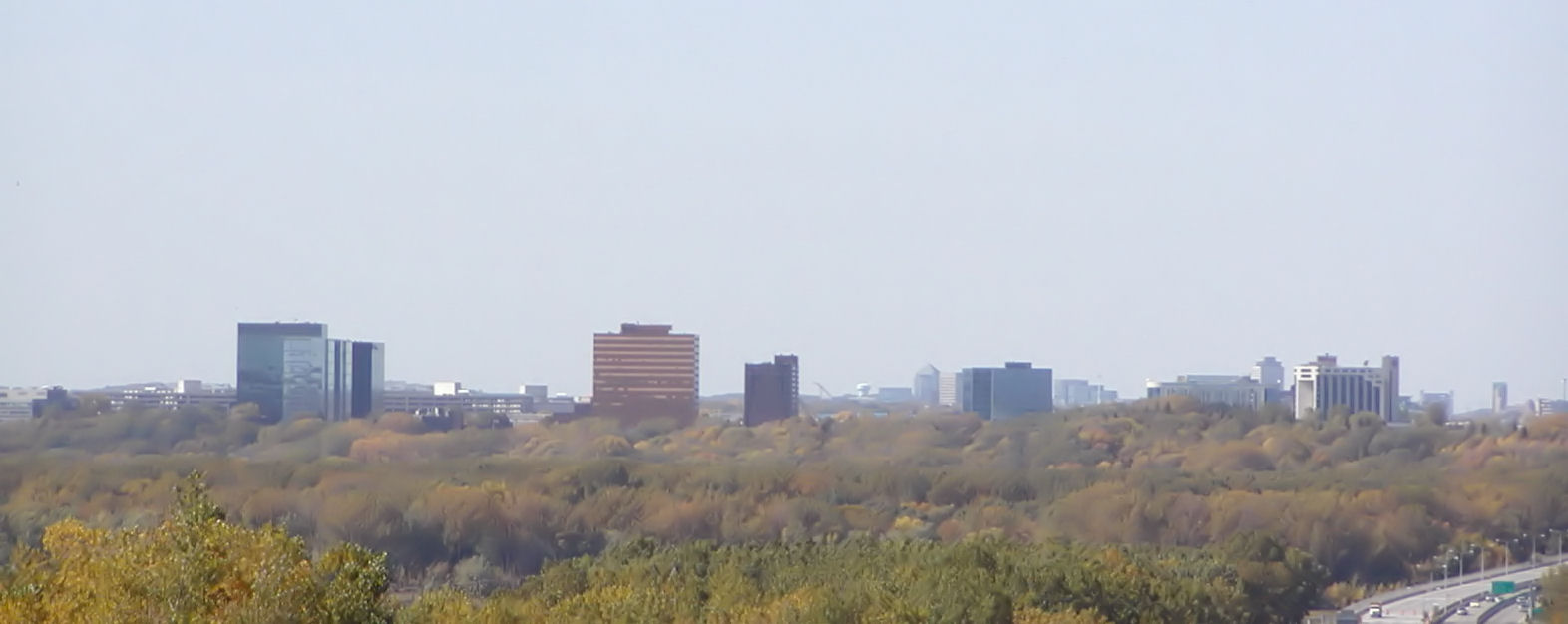
Bloomington skyline

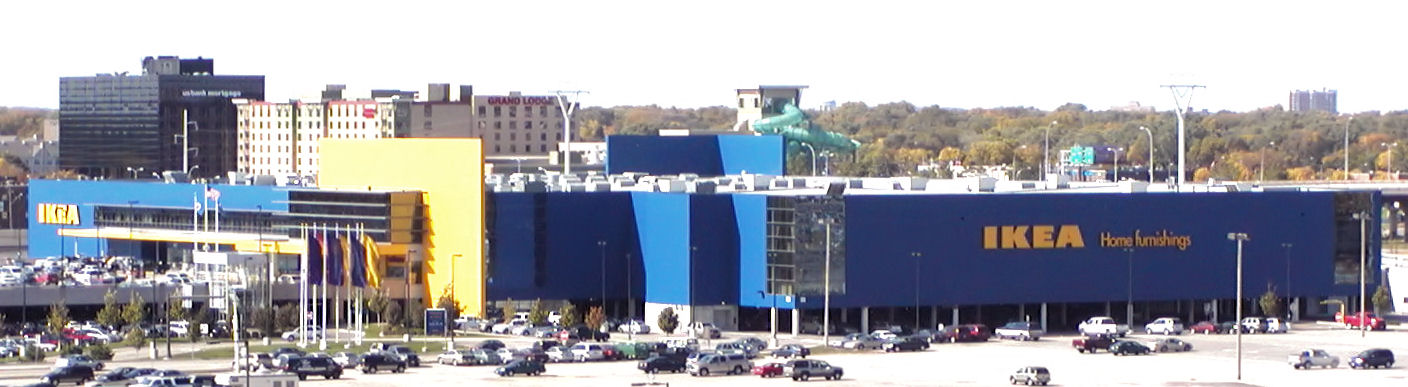
Bloomington IKEA

The 1980s brought radical change to Bloomington with the departure of the Twins and Vikings. On September 30, 1981, the last baseball game was played at Metropolitan Stadium (Kansas City Royals 5, Twins 2) as the Twins and Vikings moved to the newly constructed Hubert H. Humphrey Metrodome in downtown Minneapolis for the 1982 season. In 1985, the Bloomington Port Authority purchased the 86-acre (350,000 m^{2}) Met Stadium site and in less than two years approved first site plans for Mall of America. Two years later, groundbreaking took place for the new megamall, and in 1992, it opened to the public. Today, tenants of Mall of America, when combined, constitute the largest private-sector employer in Bloomington, employing about 13,000 people.

In 1993, the Minnesota North Stars moved to Dallas, and a year later the Metropolitan Sports Center was demolished. In 2004, an IKEA store opened on the west end of the former Met Center site. The remainder of the property is planned to be the site for Mall of America Phase II. In May 2006, the Water Park of America (now Great Wolf Lodge) opened.

In 2019, Bloomington passed an ordinance that forbade filming students of Dar Al-Farooq Islamic Center in a public park. This led to a successful lawsuit in the United States Court of Appeals for the Eighth Circuit against the city to reinstate the First Amendment rights of the parties involved. Keith Ellison had previously asked the court to drop the case.

Bloomington was a potential site for hosting the Expo 2027. However, in June 2023, Belgrade, Serbia was chosen for hosting the Expo 2027. In November 2023, Bloomington voters approved three ballot questions enacting a 0.5% local option sales tax to raise $155 million for the construction of three municipal projects: a new public health and community center replacing Creekside Community Center, renovations to the Bloomington Ice Garden, and restoration and improvements to Nine Mile Creek.

== Geography ==
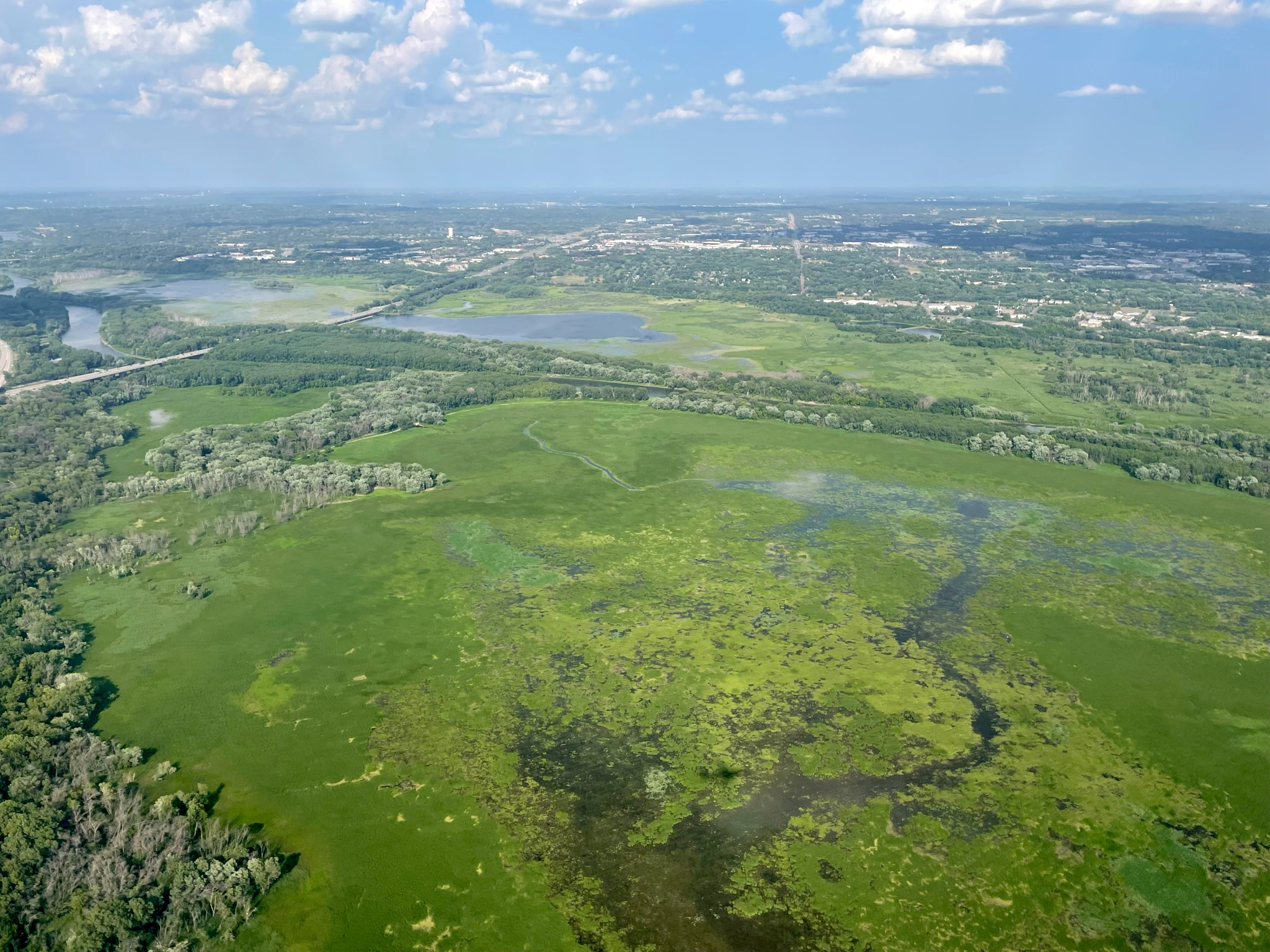
Bloomington includes portions of the Minnesota River Valley on its southern and eastern sides

According to the United States Census Bureau, the city has an area of 38.395 square miles (99.44 km^{2}), of which 34.699 square miles (89.87 km^{2}) is land and 3.696 square miles (9.57 km^{2}) or 9.73% is water.

There are three primary land types in the city. The northeastern part of the city is a sand plain, low hills dominate the western part, and the far south lies within the valley of the Minnesota River.

About a third of the city is permanently reserved for park purposes, including two large natural areas—the Minnesota Valley's wetlands (controlled by the City and the United States Fish and Wildlife Service) and the Hyland Lake Park Reserve (controlled by the Three Rivers Park District).

Water bodies in the city include Bush Lake, Long Meadow Lake, Normandale Lake, Marsh Lake (Hennepin), Nine Mile Creek, Penn Lake and about 100 small lakes and ponds with their wetland habitats.

Climate data for Bloomington, Minnesota
| Month | Jan | Feb | Mar | Apr | May | Jun | Jul | Aug | Sep | Oct | Nov | Dec | Year |
|---|---|---|---|---|---|---|---|---|---|---|---|---|---|
| Mean daily maximum °F (°C) | 22 (−6) | 29 (−2) | 41 (5) | 57 (14) | 70 (21) | 79 (26) | 83 (28) | 80 (27) | 71 (22) | 58 (14) | 40 (4) | 26 (−3) | 55 (13) |
| Mean daily minimum °F (°C) | 4 (−16) | 12 (−11) | 23 (−5) | 36 (2) | 48 (9) | 58 (14) | 63 (17) | 61 (16) | 51 (11) | 39 (4) | 25 (−4) | 11 (−12) | 36 (2) |
| Average precipitation inches (mm) | 1.04 (26) | 0.79 (20) | 1.86 (47) | 2.31 (59) | 3.24 (82) | 4.34 (110) | 4.04 (103) | 4.05 (103) | 2.69 (68) | 2.11 (54) | 1.94 (49) | 1.00 (25) | 29.41 (746) |
Source: weather.com

The city is informally divided by Interstate 35W into "West Bloomington" and "East Bloomington". West Bloomington is mostly residential with newer housing stock, along with multi-story office high-rises along Interstate Highway 494 in the north, whereas East Bloomington contains more industry, destination retail centers, and the majority of Bloomington's less expensive housing. The dividing line may be placed as far west as France Avenue, where the high school attendance boundaries meet.

== Economy ==
The city is home to a large contingent of employers, providing more than 100,000 jobs. Benefiting from its proximity to major transportation routes and the Minneapolis–Saint Paul International Airport, Bloomington is a major hospitality center with nearly 8,000 hotel rooms.

Ceridian, Donaldson Company, the Evangelical Free Church of America, Great Clips, Leeann Chin, HealthPartners, Holiday Stationstores, Highland Bank, Thermo King, Dairy Queen and Toro have their headquarters in Bloomington.

=== Top employers ===
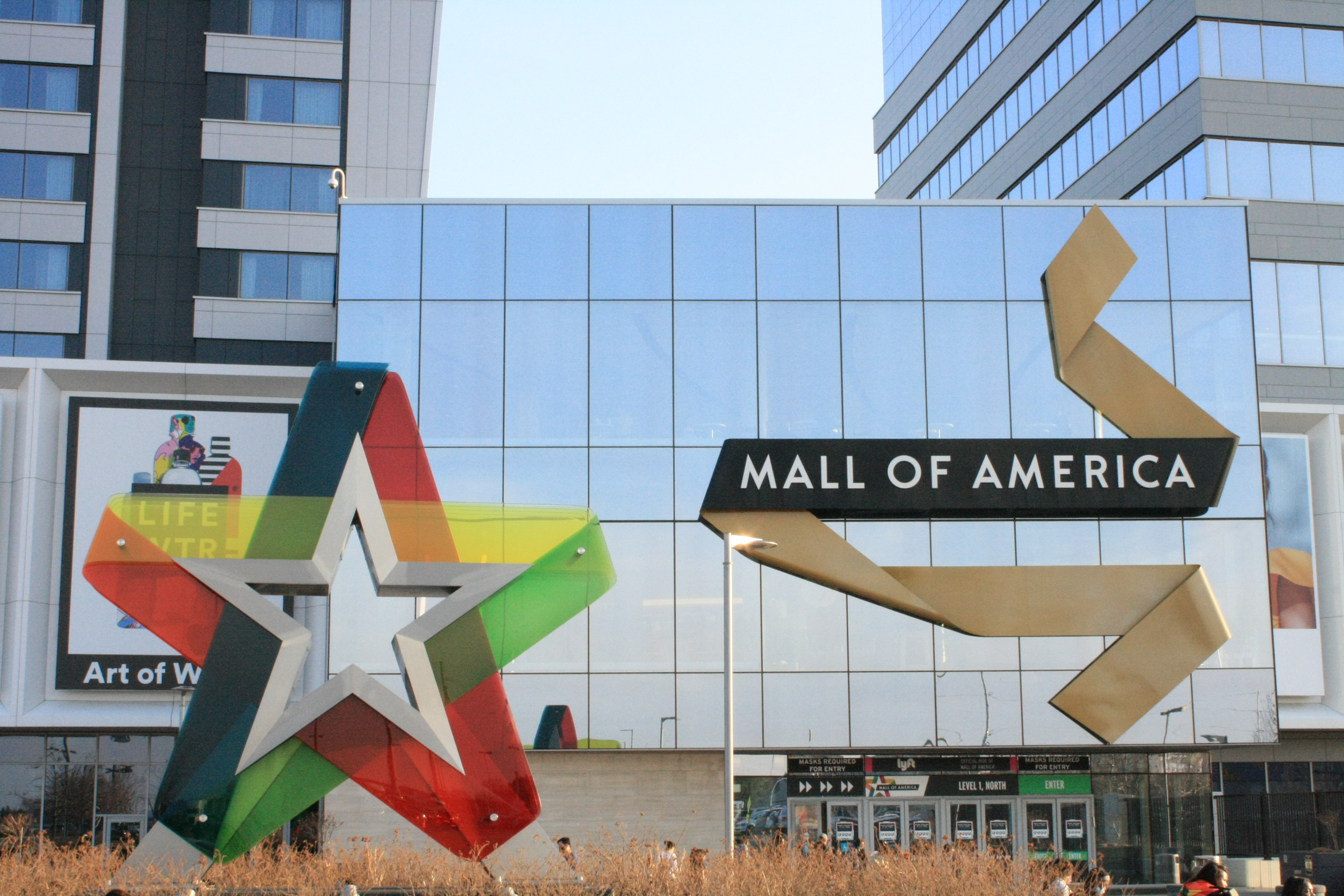
Mall of America and its tenants represent the largest employer in Bloomington.

According to the City's 2023 Annual Comprehensive Financial Report, the top employers in the city are:

| # | Employer | # of Employees |
|---|---|---|
| 1 | Mall of America (Tenants) | 11,000 |
| 2 | HealthPartners | 3,533 |
| 3 | Bloomington School District #271 | 1,950 |
| 4 | Seagate Technology | 1,365 |
| 5 | Toro | 1,150 |
| 6 | Donaldson Company | 1,126 |
| 7 | General Dynamics | 775 |
| 8 | NCS Pearson | 683 |
| 9 | Ziegler | 675 |
| 10 | GN Resound | 660 |

Other major employers include Express Scripts, Thermo King Corporation/Ingersoll Rand Inc., and Polar Semiconductor Inc.

=== Development ===
While the city is still largely suburban in nature, Bloomington has promoted the development of several urban nodes, particularly in areas well-served by public transportation. The Penn-American District, located near the center of the city, is home to Southtown Center and several new apartment buildings, and is served by the Metro Orange Line. The Normandale Lake District contains a large office complex and is situated between Normandale Lake and Interstate 494. Finally, the South Loop District, which forms the area around the Mall of America, encompasses the Minnesota River bluff and many new hotel, apartment, office, and retail buildings, including the Bloomington Central Station development on the Metro Blue Line light rail.

== Education ==
ISD 271 has served the pre-kindergarten to grade 12 educational needs of the city since the 1960s, with an operating fund revenue of $148.1 million in 2020. Fifteen public schools in Bloomington are operated by the district as well as a K-12 online school, governed by a seven-member elected school board, which appointed Superintendent Eric Melbye in 2021. The previous superintendent, Les Fujitake, served from 2006 until 2020. The city's first public charter school, Seven Hills Preparatory Academy, opened in 2006. As many families remain in or continue to move into the city, there has been support for levy increases. In 1999, the then-largest school bond issue in Minnesota history was approved, funding a $107 million school expansion and renovation project. Washburn Elementary School became a preschool, renamed 'Early Learning at Washburn', in 2025.

The district's two high schools are John F. Kennedy High School in the east and Thomas Jefferson High School in the west. New Code Academy is an online high school for students in any area. The determining boundary for high school attendance runs near the center of Bloomington on France and Xerxes Avenues, though both schools have open enrollment.

Public schools in Bloomington
| Elementary schools | Middle schools | High schools |
|---|---|---|
| Hillcrest Community | New Code Academy | John F. Kennedy |
| Indian Mounds | Olson | Thomas Jefferson |
| Normandale Hills | Oak Grove | New Code Academy |
| New Code Academy | Valley View |
| Oak Grove |
Olson
Poplar Bridge
Ridgeview
Valley View
Westwood

Bloomington's third high school, Abraham Lincoln High School (originally Bloomington High School), closed in 1982 and was sold to the Control Data Corporation in the mid-1980s. Bloomington Stadium, next to the former high school, was used by both Kennedy High School and Jefferson High School for football, lacrosse, and soccer games until 2025. In 2025, both schools constructed their own stadiums, and have fully phased out Bloomington Stadium due to the significant repairs needed, and similar long-term costs.

Mindquest, the nation's first online public high school, operated between 1995 and 2003 through the Bloomington Public Schools.

=== Private schools ===
- Bloomington Lutheran School is a K–8 Christian school associated with the WELS. The school is near Bloomington Ferry Road and Old Shakopee Road.
- Nativity of Mary School is on Lyndale Avenue. It is associated with the Nativity of Mary Catholic Church and community.
- United Christian Academy provides K–12 Christian Education. Just west of France Avenue on 98th Street, it is interdenominational with representation of over 60 different Christian churches.

=== Higher education ===
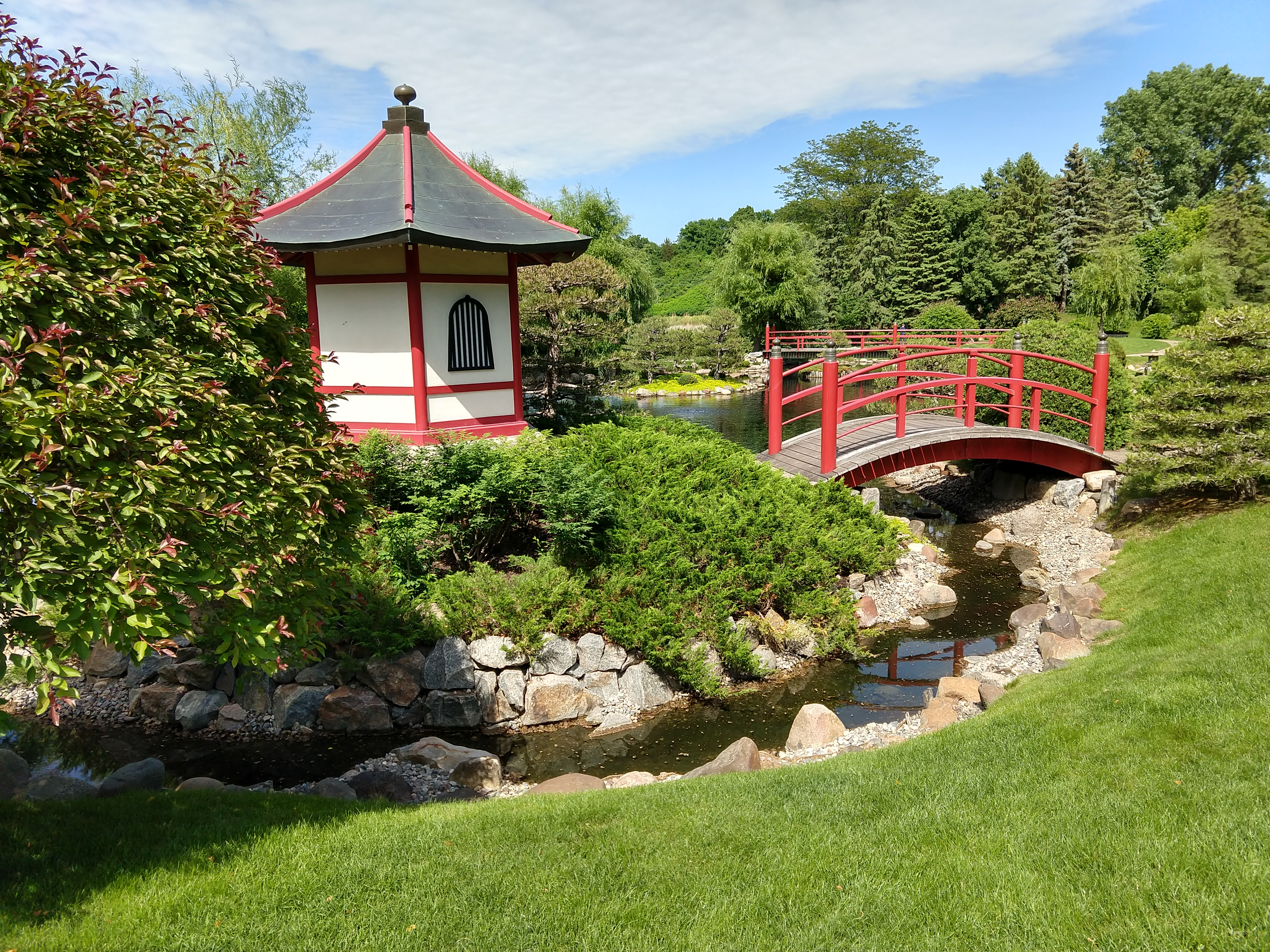
Japanese garden at Normandale Community College

- Normandale Community College is a two-year college with about 18,000 full- and part-time students, founded in 1968. It is part of the Minnesota State Colleges and Universities (MnSCU) system.
- Northwestern Health Sciences University focuses on alternative health care and patient research, in the areas of chiropractic, acupuncture, oriental medicine, and massage.
- Rasmussen University offers more than 70 programs leading to associate degrees, bachelor's degrees, and a variety of certificates and diplomas.

== Demographics ==
Historical population
| Census | Pop. | Note | %± |
|---|---|---|---|
| 1860 | 424 | | — |
| 1870 | 738 | | 74.1% |
| 1880 | 819 | | 11.0% |
| 1890 | 959 | | 17.1% |
| 1900 | 1,085 | | 13.1% |
| 1910 | 1,161 | | 7.0% |
| 1920 | 1,330 | | 14.6% |
| 1930 | 2,655 | | 99.6% |
| 1940 | 3,647 | | 37.4% |
| 1950 | 9,902 | | 171.5% |
| 1960 | 50,498 | | 410.0% |
| 1970 | 81,971 | | 62.3% |
| 1980 | 81,831 | | −0.2% |
| 1990 | 86,355 | | 5.5% |
| 2000 | 85,172 | | −1.4% |
| 2010 | 82,893 | | −2.7% |
| 2020 | 89,987 | | 8.6% |
| 2025 (est.) | 89,034 | | −1.1% |
U.S. Decennial Census; 2020 Census

=== Racial and ethnic composition ===
Bloomington, Minnesota – racial and ethnic composition Note: the US Census treats Hispanic/Latino as an ethnic category. This table excludes Latinos from the racial categories and assigns them to a separate category. Hispanics/Latinos may be of any race.
| Race / ethnicity (NH = non-Hispanic) | Pop. 2000 | Pop. 2010 | Pop. 2020 | % 2000 | % 2010 | % 2020 |
|---|---|---|---|---|---|---|
| White alone (NH) | 74,008 | 63,974 | 61,243 | 86.89% | 77.18% | 68.06% |
| Black or African American alone (NH) | 2,854 | 5,839 | 8,823 | 3.35% | 7.04% | 9.81% |
| Native American or Alaska Native alone (NH) | 265 | 267 | 448 | 0.31% | 0.32% | 0.50% |
| Asian alone (NH) | 4,306 | 4,835 | 5,910 | 5.06% | 5.83% | 6.57% |
| Native Hawaiian or Pacific Islander alone (NH) | 27 | 33 | 45 | 0.03% | 0.04% | 0.05% |
| Other race alone (NH) | 132 | 154 | 479 | 0.16% | 0.19% | 0.53% |
| Mixed race or multiracial (NH) | 1,290 | 2,168 | 3,879 | 1.52% | 2.62% | 4.31% |
| Hispanic or Latino (any race) | 2,290 | 5,623 | 8,872 | 2.69% | 6.78% | 9.86% |
| Total | 85,172 | 82,893 | 89,987 | 100.00% | 100.00% | 100.00% |

=== 2020 census ===
As of the 2020 census, there were 89,987 people, 38,080 households, and 22,394 families residing in the city. The population density was 2,593.1 inhabitants per square mile (1,001.2/km^{2}). There were 39,600 housing units, of which 3.8% were vacant; the homeowner vacancy rate was 0.7% and the rental vacancy rate was 4.5%.

Of the 38,080 households, 23.8% had children under the age of 18 living in them. Of all households, 44.4% were married-couple households, 19.8% were households with a male householder and no spouse or partner present, and 28.6% were households with a female householder and no spouse or partner present. About 32.6% of all households were made up of individuals and 14.4% had someone living alone who was 65 years of age or older.

The median age was 41.2 years. 19.4% of residents were under the age of 18 and 21.0% were 65 years of age or older. For every 100 females there were 96.0 males, and for every 100 females age 18 and over there were 93.2 males age 18 and over.

99.6% of residents lived in urban areas, while 0.4% lived in rural areas.

Racial composition as of the 2020 census
| Race | Number | Percent |
|---|---|---|
| White | 62,405 | 69.3% |
| Black or African American | 8,939 | 9.9% |
| American Indian and Alaska Native | 694 | 0.8% |
| Asian | 5,958 | 6.6% |
| Native Hawaiian and Other Pacific Islander | 51 | 0.1% |
| Some other race | 5,560 | 6.2% |
| Two or more races | 6,380 | 7.1% |
| Hispanic or Latino (of any race) | 8,872 | 9.9% |

=== 2022 American Community Survey (ACS) ===
There are 37,653 households accounted for in the 2022 ACS, with an average of 2.33 persons per household. The city's median gross rent is $1,426 in the 2022 ACS. The 2022 ACS reports a median household income of $87,381, with 67.0% of households are owner occupied. 7.9% of the city's population lives at or below the poverty line (down from previous ACS surveys). The city boasts a 68.8% employment rate, with 44.9% of the population holding a bachelor's degree or higher and 92.8% holding a high school diploma.

The top nine reported ancestries (people were allowed to report up to two ancestries, thus the figures will generally add to more than 100%) were German (22.7%), Norwegian (12.2%), Irish (8.3%), English (5.2%), Polish (3.6%), Subsaharan African (3.6%), French (except Basque) (2.9%), Italian (1.6%), and Scottish (0.8%).

The median age in the city was 40.0 years.

=== 2010 census ===
As of the 2010 census, there were 82,893 people, 35,905 households, and 21,618 families residing in the city. The population density was 2,390.1 inhabitants per square mile (922.8/km^{2}). There were 37,641 housing units at an average density of 1,085.4 per square mile (419.1/km^{2}). The racial makeup of the city was 79.7% White, 7.2% African American, 0.4% Native American, 5.9% Asian, 0.1% Pacific Islander, 3.7% from other races, and 3.1% from two or more races. Hispanic or Latino people of any race were 6.8% of the population. East Bloomington is notably more diverse than West Bloomington.

There were 35,905 households, of which 24.7% had children under the age of 18 living with them, 46.6% were married couples living together, 9.7% had a female householder with no husband present, 3.9% had a male householder with no wife present, and 39.8% were non-families. Of all households 32.2% were made up of individuals, and 12.2% had someone living alone who was 65 years of age or older. The average household size was 2.28 and the average family size was 2.89.

The median age in the city was 42.7 years. 19.7% of residents were under the age of 18; 7.9% were between the ages of 18 and 24; 25.1% were from 25 to 44; 28.9% were from 45 to 64; and 18.4% were 65 years of age or older. The gender makeup of the city was 48.4% male and 51.6% female.

Of the 19.7% of the population under 18, much of the young population is considerably more diverse than the mostly white adult population.

== Government and politics ==
=== Politics ===
2024 presidential election by precinct Harris: 50–60% 60–70%

Bloomington city vote by party in presidential elections
| Year | Democratic | Republican | Third Parties |
|---|---|---|---|
| 2024 | 63.95% 33,316 | 33.38% 17,390 | 2.67% 1,391 |
| 2020 | 64.00% 35,220 | 33.65% 18,517 | 2.35% 1,293 |
| 2016 | 55.24% 27,838 | 35.86% 18,071 | 8.89% 4,482 |
| 2012 | 58.56% 28,510 | 42.27% 21,689 | 2.17% 1,115 |
| 2008 | 55.76% 28,570 | 42.36% 21,703 | 1.87% 960 |
| 2004 | 52.28% 26,595 | 46.64% 23,722 | 1.08% 550 |
| 2000 | 49.01% 20,056 | 45.01% 18,418 | 5.98% 2,446 |

Bloomington is governed by a seven-member part-time city council. Members include the mayor and six council members, of whom four are elected from districts and two elected at-large. Members are elected to four-year terms, except during redistricting when all district council members have a two-year term. Elections are nonpartisan; since 2021, they have been conducted by ranked-choice voting after more than 51% of voters voted yes on a ballot question on the topic. An effort to repeal ranked-choice voting failed after a petition again put it on the ballot in 2024, with over 51% of voters voting against the repeal.

City operations are controlled by three interrelated entities: the City itself, the Port Authority, and the Housing and Redevelopment Authority (HRA). The Port Authority was formerly responsible for managing development in the South Loop District, in the easternmost part of the city, where the Mall of America is. In 2022, it expanded its economic development services to the entire city. The HRA handles low-income housing in the city and manages the city's redevelopment activities. Membership on the boards of the Port Authority and HRA is controlled by the City Council. Several boards and commissions also exist that are advisory to the City Council: the Advisory Board of Health, Charter Commission, Creative Placemaking Commission, Human Rights Commission, Local Board of Appeal and Equalization, Merit Board, Parks, Arts, and Recreation Commission, and the Sustainability Commission.

The city's organizing document, the City Charter, was approved by voters on November 8, 1960.

The mayor is Tim Busse, who won the 2020 election.

=== Municipal services ===
The Bloomington Fire Department operates out of six fire stations, and uses the latest in fire-fighting equipment. The department has 30 fire-fighting vehicles, including pumpers, hook and ladders, specialty units (one vehicle compact enough to navigate the Mall of America's parking ramps), and spares, all of which are equipped with Opticom System equipment, which automatically switches traffic signals to expedite emergency runs. The average response time is four minutes. In 2021, the city began transitioning to a full-time fire department through SAFER grants in 2022 and 2024. It was formerly one of Minnesota's largest remaining volunteer fire departments.

Public safety is protected by Bloomington's 142-officer police department. The current police chief is Booker T. Hodges. The officers have Ford Police Interceptor squad SUV's, with each containing a computer-assisted dispatching center that contains a computerized records system, mobile digital terminals that allow officers direct access to warrant information and state motor vehicle and driver's license records, and Opticom System equipment, which automatically switches traffic signals. The police department is also supported by seven canine teams: six dual-purpose patrol dogs, and a single-purpose narcotics dog. The police department has one of Minnesota's four bomb squads and a 20-member SWAT team.

=== State and federal representation ===
In the Minnesota Legislature, Bloomington is represented by Representatives Julie Greene (District 50A), Steve Elkins (District 50B), and Nathan Coulter (District 51B), and Senators Alice Mann (District 50) and Melissa Halvorson Wiklund (District 51).

Bloomington is in Minnesota's 3rd congressional district, represented by Democrat Kelly Morrison in the U.S. House of Representatives. In the U.S. Senate, Minnesota is served by Democrats Tina Smith and Amy Klobuchar.

== Transportation ==
Bloomington is served by several local and express bus routes operated by Metro Transit, Minnesota Valley Transit Authority, SouthWest Transit, and the University of Minnesota. Several rapid transit routes also operate within the city. The Metro Blue Line, a light rail line, runs between the Mall of America in Bloomington and downtown Minneapolis. It also connects to both terminals of the nearby Minneapolis–Saint Paul International Airport. Bloomington is also served by three bus rapid transit (BRT) lines. The Metro Red Line runs between the Mall of America in Bloomington and Apple Valley, Minnesota. The Metro Orange Line, which runs between Burnsville, Minnesota and downtown Minneapolis, finished construction in 2021 and travels through Bloomington on Interstate 35W. Additionally, the Metro D Line operates between the Mall of America and Brooklyn Center Transit Center through downtown Minneapolis.

== Arts and media ==
=== Museums ===
The Works is an experiential technology learning museum for youth.

The Bloomington Old Town Hall Museum, located out of a historic former town hall, operated by the Bloomington Historical Society, focuses on the history of Bloomington, ranging from the prehistoric period through the present day.

The NWA History Museum documents the history of Northwest Airlines.

=== Theater ===
Artistry is a professional theater and visual arts nonprofit that produces musicals and plays in the 366-seat Schneider Theater at the municipally owned and operated Bloomington Center for the Arts.

The Theater program at Normandale Community College presents five productions during the academic year.

The high school theater companies at Jefferson and Kennedy each stage three full length productions, a one-act, and a combined fifth production in the summer, annually.

=== Visual arts ===
Artistry curates two galleries in the Bloomington Center for the Arts.

Mhiripihri Gallery features Zimbabwean sculpture in a 3,000 sq ft (280 m^{2}) gallery.

=== Public art ===
Muralist Erik Pearson's 2007 work "Creating Together" adorns the flyloft of the theater at Bloomington Center for the Arts. Pearson also created the mural "Science and Nature" in the city's South Loop district, at the Bass Ponds trailhead entrance.

2015 marked the unveiling of "Convergence", by sculptor James Brenner. Bloomington also adopted a creative placemaking plan for its South Loop District near the Mall of America and established the Creative Placemaking Commission.

In 2018, the Wright's Lake Park mural, "Seasons of Becoming", was completed by GoodSpace Murals. It is located on Old Cedar Avenue facing Wright's Lake Park. It was inspired, designed, and painted both by the general public and by students from Valley View Middle School, from a gifted program called Nobel, focused on creativity.

In 2021, the WE Mural was completed. WE, a tapestry of murals was curated and produced by Ua Si Creative, and commissioned by the City of Bloomington as part of their creative placemaking efforts; an initiative by the City of Bloomington and the nonprofit arts organization, Artistry, to establish the South Loop as a vibrant, distinctive community. The mural faces American Boulevard and 30th Avenue South along two walls of an Xcel Energy Substation in Bloomington's South Loop District. WE Artists include: Andrés Guzman + Xee Reiter, City Mischief featuring Thomasina Topbear and Tom Jay, Reggie LeFlore, Marlena Myles, Martzia Thometz, and Ua Si Creative.

Also in 2021, The Goldfinch sculpture was installed in South Loop District, by artist Donald Lipski with support from sculptor Christopher Collins, fabricators Yetiweurks and FAST Fiberglass, and project manager John Grant. It is located at the intersection of Old Shakopee Road and Killebrew Drive. Artist Donald Lipski was inspired by the more than 250 species of birds that pass yearly through the nearby, spectacular Minnesota Valley National Wildlife Refuge. He entrusted the choice of species to a public poll, and the goldfinch was the overwhelming favorite.

Bloomington adopted a citywide creative placemaking plan in 2025 in order to improve community spaces in alignment with the city's strategic plan.

=== Television ===
Comcast provides access to four Bloomington cable television stations for public, educational, and government access (PEG) programming. They include The Bloomington Channel 14, a comprehensive source of Bloomington information and programming. The government-access television (GATV) channel features City Council and school board meetings, a weekly news magazine show called "Bloomington Today", "Roll Call", a weekly update on public safety news produced by the Bloomington Police Department, arts events, and sports. Bloomington Educational Community Television (BEC-TV) highlights educational and school-based programs from the Bloomington's public and private schools. Programming on this channel includes educational-access television content, concerts, choir shows, graduations, and sporting events. Two student produced shows are also on BEC-TV. Tomorrow's Voices Today (TVT) is a teen news show that highlights the good things teens are doing around the city and talks about teen related issues. YRU-Up was a late night call-in Public-access television cable TV talk show, airing from 1991 to 2017. Skits for the show were produced by students and the show was live every Friday night (Sat. Morning) at 12:30am on TBC (Channel 14). A third channel, BCAT, (Bloomington Cable Access Television) is a Public-access channel that allows individuals and organizations to learn video production and create television shows. The schedules for these channels can be found on a channel called the B.R.A.I.N. The PEG channels are funded by Cable television franchise fees collected in the city.

=== Film ===
Parts of the Coen brothers film A Serious Man were filmed in an East Bloomington neighborhood. The neighborhood was chosen for its original suburban ranch-style houses and young trees (due to a storm knocking older ones down), giving it a 1960s new-development look.

== Sports and recreation ==
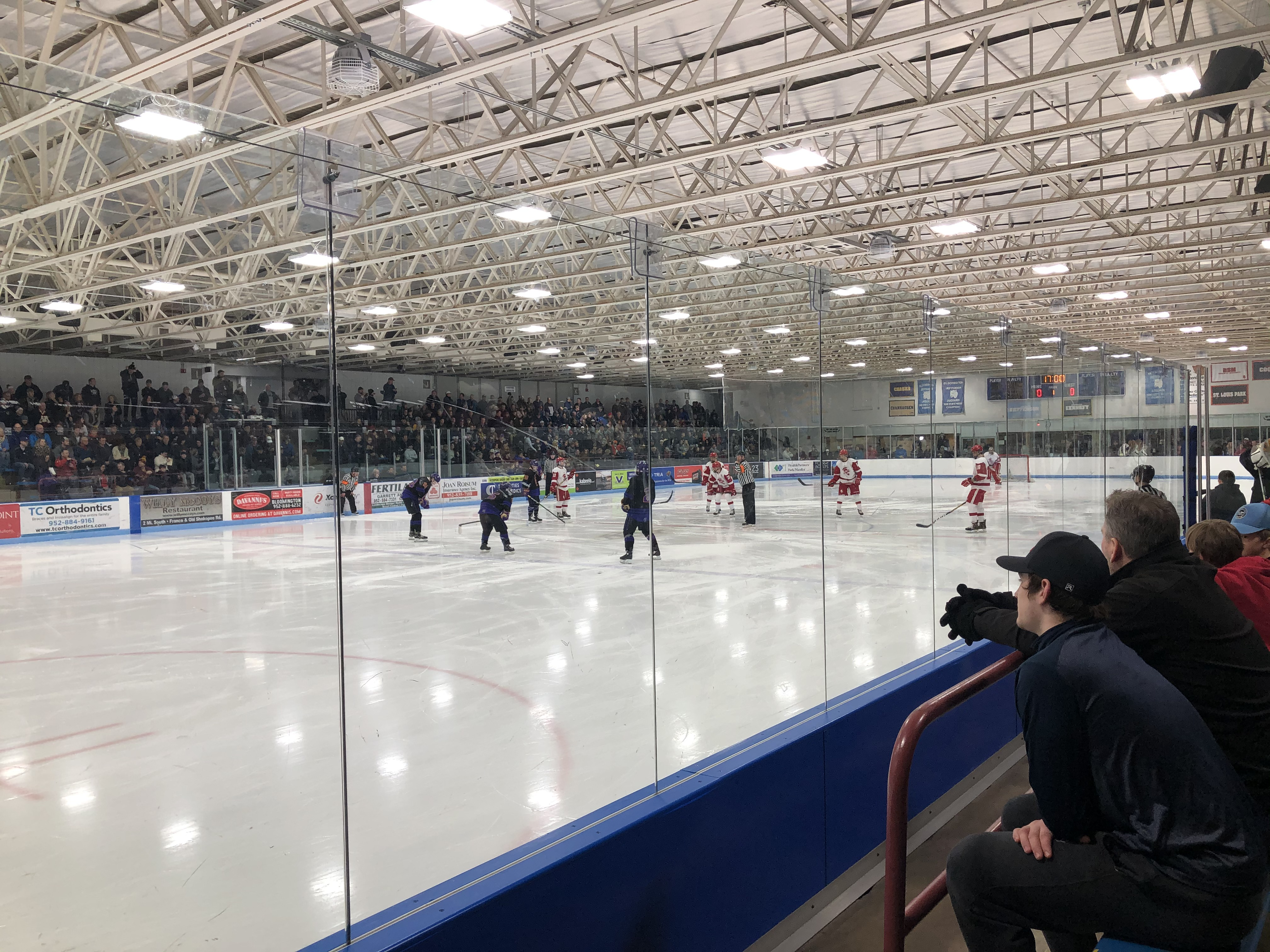
Bloomington Ice Garden during a Boys' Hockey Section 6AA playoff game between Benilde-St. Margaret's and Cretin Durham Hall

Hyland Park includes both a ski area and Nordic ski jumps. The ski jumps are maintained by the Minneapolis Ski Club and are some of the most urban ski jumps in the U.S. Several U.S. Olympic ski jumpers have come from this ski club. The Minneapolis Ski Club hosted the 2013 Junior National competition. The city also operates the Bloomington Ice Garden (BIG), which contains three ice rinks, one of which is Olympic-size and the other of which has a capacity of 2,500. It appeared in the film Miracle, with the team practicing there before the Olympics. During the winter, the Parks and Recreation Department creates 10+ outdoor skating rinks.

Bloomington was the point of growth for pickleball in Minnesota, beginning about 2005 when retirees brought the sport back from their southern-states retirement homes. From the Westwood Athletic Fields in southern Bloomington, other groups formed and grew to an active statewide player population in excess of 1,500. Bloomington is also the home of Pickleball Minnesota, the Pickleball website serving the state and the Upper Midwest.

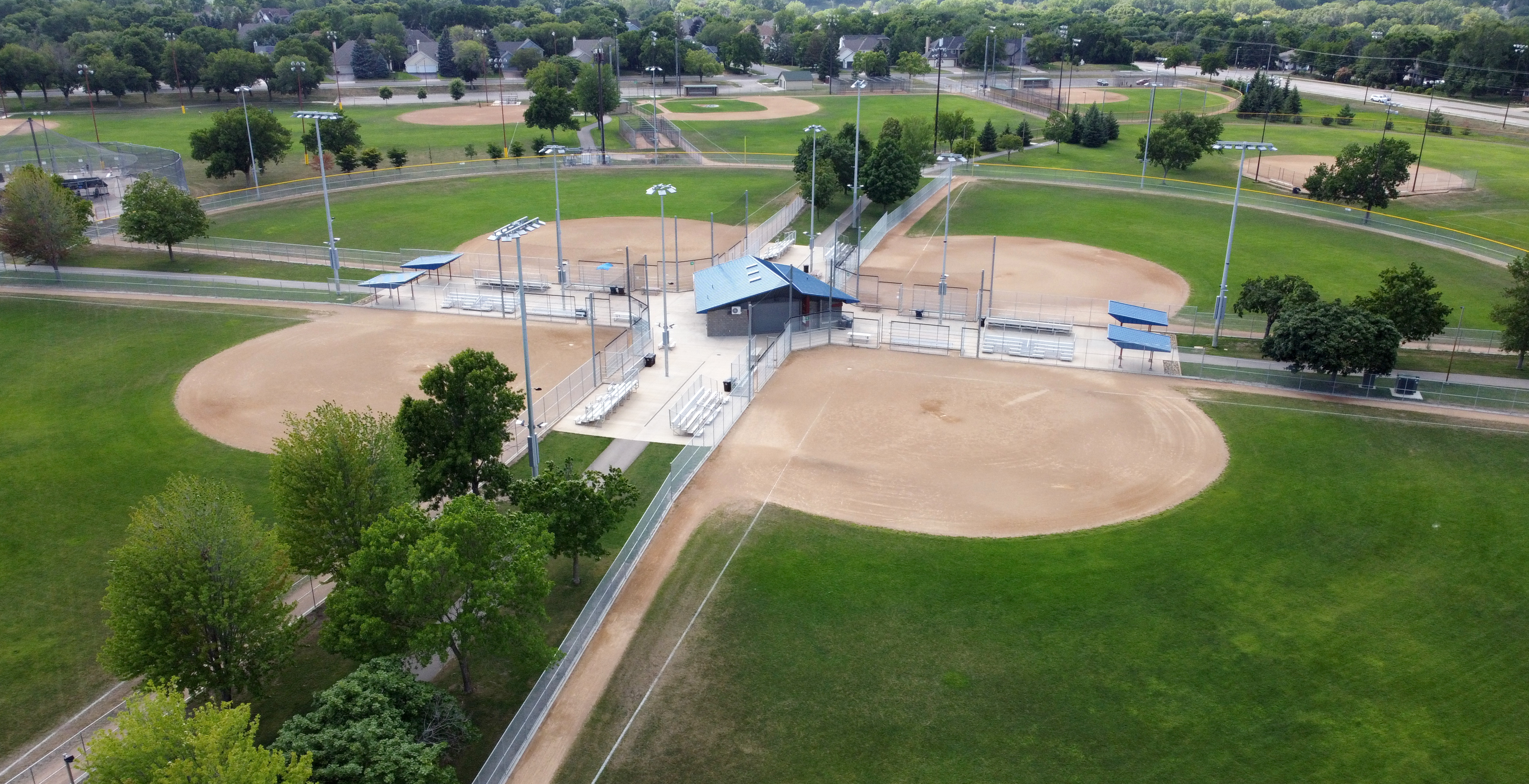
Dred Scott Playfield in Bloomington

Bloomington has two major sports complexes. Dred Scott Playfields, named after Dred Scott, is on the far West side and contains a variety of recreational activities, including baseball, softball, football, sand volleyball, tennis, and basketball. Also within the complex are an outdoor batting cage and a miniature golf course that are privately owned. Valley View Playfields on the East side contains softball and baseball fields, bocce ball courts, and the Bloomington Family Aquatic Center. Bush Lake Beach (BLB) is on Bush Lake and is open in the summer to recreational swimmers.

== Notable people ==
- Cole Aldrich, University of Kansas center and NBA player
- Lyle G. Abeln, Minnesota state legislator and educator
- William V. Belanger Jr., Minnesota state legislator and businessman
- Tom Burnett, led revolt against United Airlines Flight 93 hijackers during the September 11 attacks
- Kelly Carlson, actress and model
- Ben Clymer, retired NHL player
- Mike Crowley, retired NHL player
- Joseph Cure, ice hockey player and actor (Miracle).
- Pete Docter, film director, animator, screenwriter, producer, and voice actor, known for Monsters, Inc., Up, Inside Out and Soul
- Christian Elder, racing driver
- Verne Gagne, former professional wrestler and member of the WWE Hall of Fame
- Tom Gilbert, NHL player, grew up in Bloomington and attended Jefferson High School,
- Bud Grant, retired pro football player and coach. Head coach of Minnesota Vikings from 1967 to 1985
- Joseph P. Graw, Minnesota state legislator and businessman
- Tim Harrer, retired NHL player
- Julia Hart, wrestler
- Elena Hayday, professional distance runner
- Joyce Henry, Minnesota state legislator
- John Himle, Minnesota state legislator
- Kent Hrbek, retired Minnesota Twins player
- Kyle Jacobs, country music songwriter and husband to Kellie Pickler
- Erik Johnson, NHL player for the Colorado Avalanche, also for Team USA during the 2010 Winter Olympics
- Lane Kiffin, head football coach of Louisiana State University
- Lloyd Lee, former Chicago Bears linebackers coach
- Mark P. Mahon, Minnesota state legislator
- Frank Moe, Minnesota state legislator and educator
- Peter Mueller, NHL player for the Florida Panthers
- Tony Oliva, retired Minnesota Twins player
- Zach Parise, NHL player for the New York Islanders, former player for the Minnesota Wild
- Mark Parrish, retired NHL player
- Tom Pederson, retired NHL player
- Remo Drive, alternative rock band
- Steve Rushin, former Sports Illustrated columnist
- Bryan Schmidt, AHL and DEL player
- Donny Schmit, 1990 125cc and 1992 250cc Motocross World Champion
- Jenna Smith, University of Illinois Women's basketball and WNBA Washington Mystics
- Warren Spannaus, former Minnesota Attorney General
- Ryan Stoa, NHL player for the Washington Capitals
- Milt Sunde, retired NFL player who played for the Vikings; graduate of Bloomington Lincoln
- Mod Sun, singer, songwriter, and rapper
- Paul Thissen, 58th Speaker of the Minnesota House of Representatives and Minnesota Supreme Court Justice
- Dan Trebil, retired NHL player
- Blackie Wangerin, racing driver
- Scott Weiland, lead singer of Stone Temple Pilots, died in Bloomington
- Melissa Wiklund, state senator
- Jackson Yueill, soccer player
