= School Infrastructure Local Option =

Sales tax in Iowa, United States

The School Infrastructure Local Option (SILO) is a 1% local option sales tax adopted on a county by county basis in Iowa, United States. Although the tax is collected by county, state mandate says the total amount collected is to be pooled and shared between the school districts. SILO was developed in 1998 by the Iowa General Assembly to give school districts a revenue options other than the property tax. The tax can be enacted for up to 10 years at a time. As of late 2005, only Linn and Johnson counties in Iowa had not enacted a SILO tax. In the spring of 2006 the Iowa legislature encouraged the two remaining counties to join the other 97 counties which had enacted this tax by offering an incentive provided the tax was enacted by July 1, 2008, allowing the districts to keep 100% of the money generated for the first half of the time it is collected instead of pooling it statewide. A vote was scheduled in both counties for February 13, 2007 where it was approved, 58% to 42% in Linn County and 67% to 33% in Johnson County. The tax for both counties went into effect on July 1, 2007 for a period of 10 years, making it a statewide tax. Iowa currently has a 6% state sales tax rate in addition to the 1% SILO tax and any other Local Option Sales Taxes (LOST) which may be in effect in each county, often an additional 1%.
