= 2023 Bloomington, Minnesota municipal election =

- November 7, 2023

The 2023 Bloomington, Minnesota municipal election was held on November 7, 2025. Bloomington's mayor was up for election, as well as all six city council seats. Additionally, voters decided three ballot measures concerning the establishment of a local sales tax to fund infrastructure projects. It was the second election to use ranked-choice voting in the city, and voters ranked up to three candidates per city office. City council Districts I, II, and the at-large special election were up for two-year terms, while the mayoral race, city council at-large, and Districts III and IV were up for four-year terms.

Bloomington's mayor and five city councilmembers were re-elected. In the open District IV race, conservative Victor Rivas was elected, a change from previous unanimously progressive councils.

== Mayor ==
Incumbent mayor Tim Busse is seeking re-election to a second term. Busse has been in office since 2020. In the previous year's election, he garnered 55.74% of the popular vote.

=== Candidates ===
==== Filed ====
- Tim Busse, incumbent mayor
- David Clark, airline captain and small business owner

=== Endorsements ===
Tim Busse

Labor unions

- Minneapolis Regional Labor Federation

=== Results ===
Results by precinct: Busse: 50%–60%; 60%–70%; Clark: 50%–60%

Mayor results
Candidate	Round 1	
Candidate	Votes	%
Tim Busse (incumbent)	11,859	58.11
David Clark	8,512	41.71
Write-ins	37	0.18
Total active votes	20,408	100.00
Source: Bloomington City Clerk's Office

== City Council ==
Due to redistricting and an at-large special election, all six seats on the Bloomington City Council are up for election, including both at-large seats and all four district seats.

=== At-large ===
Incumbent Jenna Carter is seeking an additional four-year term.

==== Candidates ====
===== Declared =====
- Jenna Carter, incumbent councilmember (at-large)
- Bruce Colton

==== Endorsements ====
Jenna Carter

Organizations

- Minneapolis Regional Labor Federation

==== Results ====
Results by precinct: Carter: 50%–60%; 60%–70%; Colton: 50%–60%

At-large results
Candidate	Round 1	
Candidate	Votes	%
Jenna Carter (incumbent)	12,173	61.65
Bruce Colton	7,539	38.18
Write-ins	32	0.16
Total active votes	19,744	100.00
Source: Bloomington City Clerk's Office

=== At-large (special election) ===
Incumbent Chao Moua was appointed to this seat in February 2023, filling a vacancy, and is seeking election. This special election is for a two-year term.

==== Candidates ====
===== Declared =====
- Chao Moua, incumbent councilmember (at-large)
- Jonathan A. Minks
- Maxwell Collins

==== Endorsements ====
Chao Moua

Organizations

- Minneapolis Regional Labor Federation

==== Results ====
Results by precinct: Moua: 40%–50%; 50%–60%; Minks: 40%–50%; 50%–60%

At-large (special election) results
Candidate	Round 1		Round 2		
Candidate	Votes	%	Transfer	Votes	%
Chao Moua (incumbent)	8,757	45.19	+1,069	9,826	54.56
Jonathan A. Minks	7,760	40.04	+424	8,184	45.44
Maxwell Collins	2,828	14.59	-2828	Eliminated	
Write-ins	33	0.17	-33	Eliminated	
Total active votes	19,378	100.00	-2,861	18,010	100.00
Source: Bloomington City Clerk's Office

=== District I ===
District I covers the southeast quadrant of Bloomington. Incumbent Dwayne Lowman is seeking re-election.

==== Candidates ====
===== Declared =====
- Dwayne Lowman, incumbent councilmember (District I)
- Al Noard

==== Endorsements ====
Dwayne Lowman

Organizations

- Minneapolis Regional Labor Federation

==== Results ====
Results by precinct: Lowman: 50%–60%; 60%–70%; Noard: 50%–60%

District I results
Candidate	Round 1	
Candidate	Votes	%
Dwayne Lowman (incumbent)	2,713	54.83
Al Noard	2,225	44.97
Write-ins	10	0.20
Total active votes	4,948	100.00%
Source: Bloomington City Clerk's Office

=== District II ===
District II covers the southwest quadrant of Bloomington. Incumbent Shawn Nelson is seeking re-election.

==== Candidates ====
===== Declared =====
- Paul King
- Shawn Nelson, incumbent councilmember (District II)

==== Endorsements ====
Shawn Nelson

Organizations

- Minneapolis Regional Labor Federation

==== Results ====
Results by precinct: Nelson: 50%–60%; 60%–70%

District II results
Candidate	Round 1	
Candidate	Votes	%
Shawn Nelson (incumbent)	3,070	55.96
Paul King	2,405	43.84
Write-ins	11	0.20
Total active votes	5,486	100.00
Source: Bloomington City Clerk's Office

=== District III ===
District III covers the northwestern quadrant of Bloomington. Incumbent Lona Dallessandro is seeking re-election.

==== Candidates ====
===== Declared =====
- Lona Dallessandro, incumbent councilmember (District III)
- Mike Hartley

==== Endorsements ====
Lona Dallessandro

Organizations

- Minneapolis Regional Labor Federation

==== Results ====
Results by precinct: Dallessandro: 50%–60%

District III results
Candidate	Round 1	
Candidate	Votes	%
Lona Dallessandro (incumbent)	3,180	54.07
Mike Hartley	2,686	45.67
Write-ins	15	0.26
Total active ballots	5,881	100.00
Source: Bloomington City Clerk's Office

=== District IV ===
District IV covers the northeastern quadrant of Bloomington. Incumbent Patrick Martin is not seeking re-election.

==== Candidates ====
===== Declared =====
- Victor Rivas, candidate for this district in 2021
- Luqman Abdi
- Isaak Rooble

==== Endorsements ====
Isaak Rooble

Organizations

- Minneapolis Regional Labor Federation

==== Results ====
Results by precinct: Rivas: 40%–50%; 50%–60%; Rooble: 40%–50%

District IV results
Candidate	Round 1	
Candidate	Votes	%
Victor Rivas	1,613	52.02
Isaak Rooble	1,170	37.73
Luqman Abdi	307	9.90
Write-ins	11	0.35
Total active votes	3,101	100.00
Source: Bloomington City Clerk's Office

== Ballot measures ==
Three ballot measures were presented on the establishment of a 0.5% local option sales tax to fund three community projects, collectively known as "Bloomington Forward": a new community center, improvements to the Bloomington Ice Garden, and renewal of the Nine Mile Creek corridor and its associated parks.

=== City Question 1 ===
Sales and Use Tax for Community Health and Wellness Center

Shall the City of Bloomington impose a one-half of one percent (0.5%) sales and use tax for up to 20 years for $100 million plus the cost of interest and of issuing the bonds, to build a new Community Health and Wellness Center?

==== Results ====
Results by precinct: Yes: 50%–60%; 60%–70%; No: 50%–60%

City Question 1
Choice	Votes	%
For	11,575	56.18
Against	9,030	43.82
Total	20,605	100.00
Source: Bloomington City Clerk's Office

=== City Question 2 ===
Sales and Use Tax for Bloomington Ice Garden Improvements

Shall the City of Bloomington impose a one-half of one percent (0.5%) sales and use tax for up to 20 years for $35 million plus the cost of interest and of issuing the bonds for improvements to the Bloomington Ice Garden (“BIG”)?

==== Results ====
Results by precinct: Yes: 50%–60%; 60%–70%; No: 50%–60%

City Question 2
Choice	Votes	%
For	10,920	53.05
Against	9,665	46.95
Total	20,585	100.00
Source: Bloomington City Clerk's Office

=== City Question 3 ===
Sales and Use Tax for Nine Mile Creek Corridor Renewal

Shall the City of Bloomington impose a one-half of one percent (0.5%) sales and use tax for up to 20 years for $20 million plus the cost of interest and of issuing the bonds for new construction and restoration of the Nine Mile Creek Corridor, including Moir and Central Parks?

==== Results ====
Results by precinct: Yes: 50%–60%; 60%–70%; No: 50%–60%

City Question 3
Choice	Votes	%
For	10,757	52.30
Against	9,812	47.70
Total	20,569	100.00
Source: Bloomington City Clerk's Office
