= Azayamankawin =

19th century Dakota woman known as Old Bets

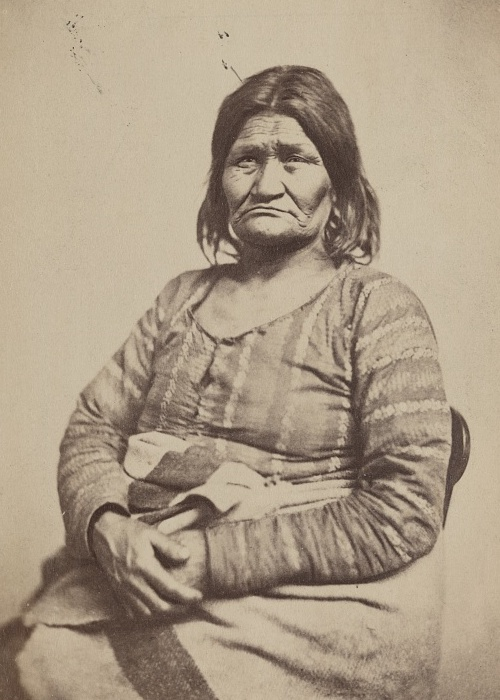
- Azayamankawin by Joel Emmons Whitney
- Born: c. 1803; Kaposia
- Died: c. 1873 (aged c. 69–70); Mendota, Minnesota
- Other names: Hazaiyankawin; Betsey St. Clair; Berry Picker; Old Betz
- Known for: Carte-de-visite portraits; Helping captives in 1862 war; Canoe ferry in Saint Paul
- Children: 12

Azayamankawin (c. 1803 – c. 1873), also known as Hazaiyankawin, Betsey St. Clair, Old Bets, or Old Betz, was one of the most photographed Native American women of the 19th century. She was a Mdewakanton Dakota woman well known in Saint Paul, Minnesota, where she once ran a canoe ferry service. Old Bets was said to have helped many women and children taken captive during the Dakota War of 1862.

Photographs of "Old Betz" were used extensively in carte-de-visite prints now held in museum collections worldwide, including the United States Library of Congress; the National Portrait Gallery in the United Kingdom; and the Minnesota Historical Society.

== Early life and family ==
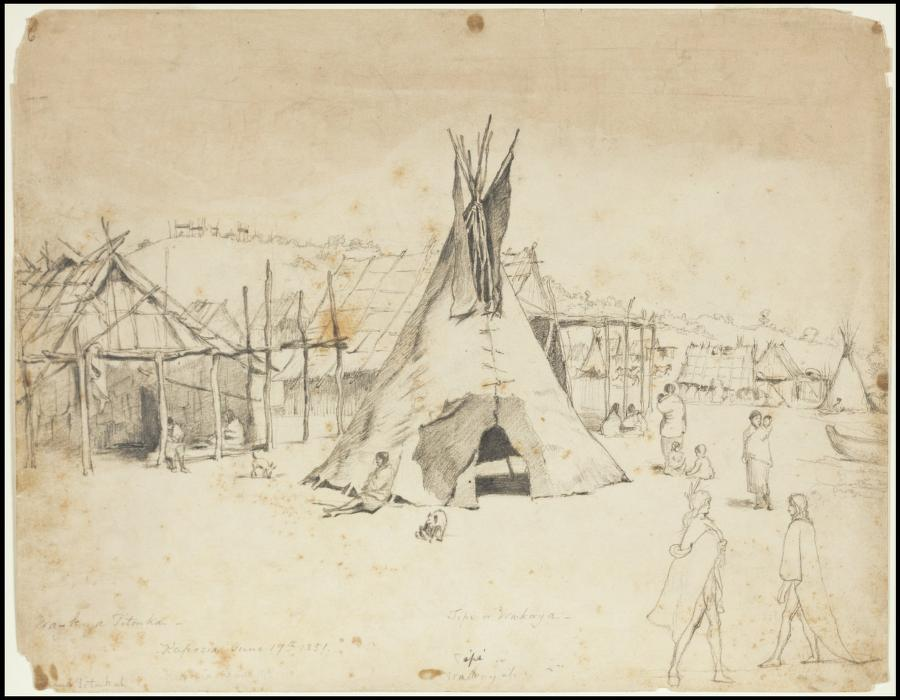
Kaposia village

Betsey's Dakota name is usually given as Azayamankawin and translated as “Berry Picker.” Biographer Mark Diedrich calls her Hazaiyankawin, which he translates as “Woman Who Runs Toward Huckleberries.” She was given the name “Betsey” or “Bets” by the soldiers who built Fort Snelling.

Azayamankawin was born around 1803, most likely in the Mdewakanton Dakota village of Kaposia. Kaposia, also known as Little Crow's village, was then located on the east bank of the Mississippi River near present-day St. Paul, Minnesota.

Her mother was Itahotawin (c.1778–1863), translated as “Grey Face Woman.” According to Mary Henderson Eastman, Itahotawin was an Ojibwe woman who had been taken prisoner by the Dakota and was later adopted by them. She married a Dakota Sioux warrior, whose name is unknown.

Azayamankawin had at least five siblings. Her brother Ticawakeya ("Shelter Top"), became known as “One-Legged Jim” after he was wounded in a battle with the Ojibwe in 1839.

Her other brothers were Hinhdaku ("He Who Is Coming"), a medicine man and war prophet, and Kahdaya ("He Who Causes a Rattling"), a headman of the Kaposia band called “Rattler.” Her two sisters were Pahadutawin ("Scarlet Hill Woman") and Huntka ("Cormorant"), who was known as “Ellen."

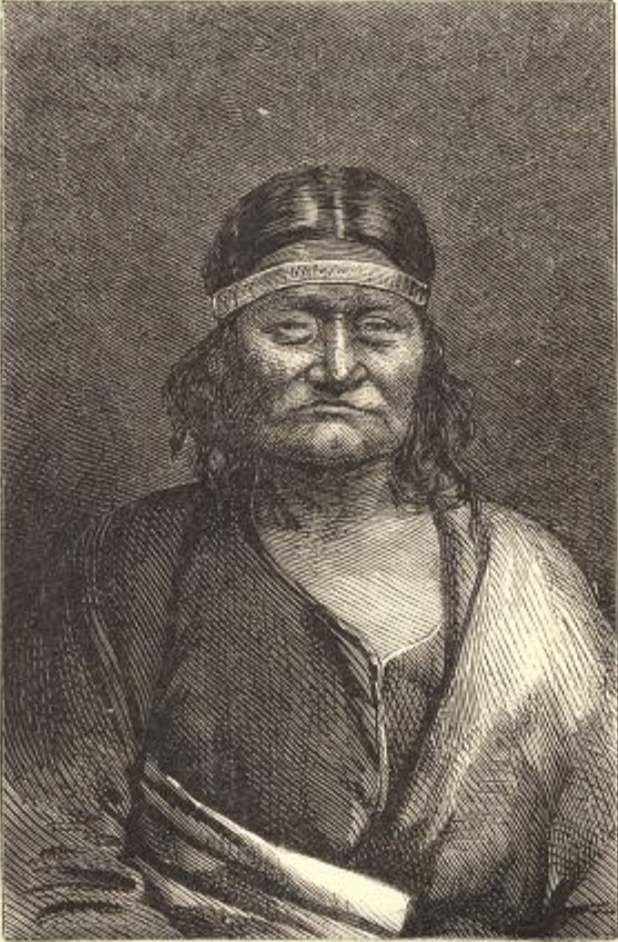
Engraving of Old Betz (c.1864)

=== Employment as nurse ===
Azayamankawin herself stated that she was a teenager when American soldiers first arrived in Mendota in 1819, led by Colonel Henry Leavenworth.

One of the few recorded facts about “Young Bets” around this time was that she was employed by a military family as a nurse to an infant who was born on Pike Island. According to Reverend Frank C. Coolbaugh:

In Lafayette, Indiana, I met a lady parishioner, who chanced to show me a daguerreotype which she cherished with the fondest attachment. To my great surprise, it was that of "Old Bets." The lady was the daughter of an army officer who had been sent with his company to occupy Fort Snelling. She was born while the company was in winter quarters on the little island in the Mississippi just below the Fort. The company was there encamped because of the insufficient barracks of the uncompleted fort. Strange to say, upon this lady's birth, "Old Bets" or "Young Bets," as it was then, was summoned and acted as nurse to mother and child. So kind and so gentle, so efficient were the services of the Indian girl, that the lieutenant and his family ever cherished the kindest thoughts and warmest affection for her.

== Stories about her romantic life ==
Numerous stories were written about the romantic life of Young Bets, some explicitly fictional. She was usually portrayed as a beautiful young woman who had many suitors. As Thomas McLean Newson wrote:

Old Bets was once young and handsome, and she drew after her many lovers… Young Bets was greatly loved, not only for her beauty, but for her kind disposition, as well as for her bravery.

In one version, she was said to have fallen in love with the son of an Ojibwe chief when the Dakota and Ojibwe were at peace. When hostilities broke out between the two tribes, the man she had planned to marry tried to kill her. Her life was saved by a Sioux warrior, who killed the Chippewa man, brought her his scalp, and married her. A variation of this story was that Young Bets was once married to a cousin of the Ojibwe chief, Hole-in-the-Day the Elder.

In another version, she was said to have fallen in love with Cegoniya, a young Dakota warrior who had “won great renown in the tribe.” However, her brother Hinhdaku refused to allow them to marry because Cegoniya had wronged him in the past. Cegoniya and Young Bets tried to elope, but Hinhdaku chased them on horseback and killed Cegoniya with a tomahawk.

== Marriages ==
=== First marriage ===
Most sources state that Azayamankawin's first husband was a Dakota warrior called “Iron Sword” or Mazasagya. Iron Sword is said to have married Azayamankawin around 1818, and died in Mendota after they had already had several children. However, there are no historical records verifying the existence of a man named Iron Sword.

Biographer Mark Diedrich suggests that instead, Betsey's first husband may have been “Flying Sword” (Sagyauka), who is mentioned by Indian agent Lawrence Taliaferro in 1828. Flying Sword was a member of the Little Crow band, and was the son of Little Soldier. Diedrich argues that this is a strong possibility, based on the fact that Betsey's great-grandson Henry St. Clair was also called Little Soldier.

=== Second marriage ===
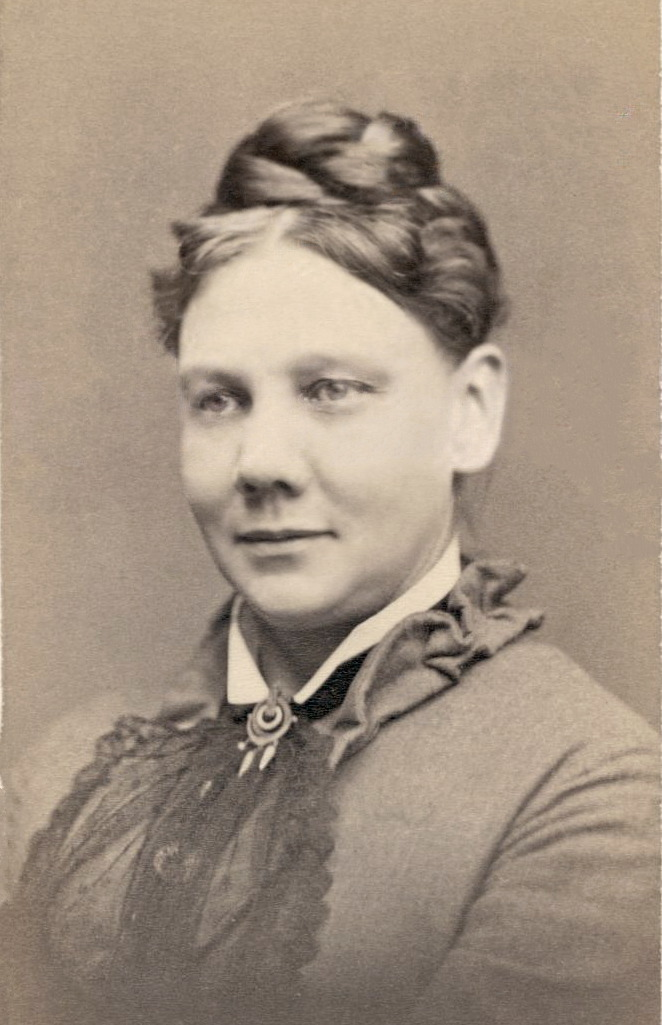
Mary Henderson Eastman (c.1872)

Azayamankawin is believed to have been married a second time, to Chief Good Road, in the 1840s. Good Road's village was at the mouth of Nine Mile Creek in present-day Bloomington. According to Mary Henderson Eastman, Good Road's two wives were always quarreling, but he preferred Old Bets, who was his second wife. In fact, she wrote, “the chief thought that she was the handsomest squaw in the village.”

Eastman also wrote that Azayamankawin's life was once threatened by eight to ten young men in Good Road's band who recalled that she was part-Ojibwe and wanted to kill her. She left the band temporarily for her safety.

After enduring years of domestic tension, Good Road finally sent off his first wife and disinherited their children. According to Eastman, the sons of Good Road's first wife exacted revenge by killing Betsey's son Shining Iron and wounding one of her daughters. Azayamankawin probably left Good Road's village following this incident.

Chief Good Road died in 1852. After his death, Betsey and her relatives received government annuities as members of the Little Crow's band, rather than Good Road's band.

== Children ==
Azayamankawin may have had up to twelve children. By far her most famous son was Taopi ("Wounded Man"). Taopi was born around 1824 and was known as Nagioskan ("Moving Soul"), until he was wounded by an Ojibwe firing into his tepee around 1838.

Other notable sons included Wakandikaga ("Lightning Maker"), later known as Job St. Clair, who was born around 1827; Wicahnhpihiyaye ("Shooting Star"), who may have been born during a meteor shower in 1832; and Ruyapaduta ("Scarlet Wing").

Two of Betsey's confirmed daughters included Dutawin ("Scarlet Woman") and Pazutawin ("Medicine Pazutawin"). Another possible daughter was Anpahdiwin ("Appearing Day Woman"), later known as Nancy St. Clair.

== Role in the Battle of Kaposia ==
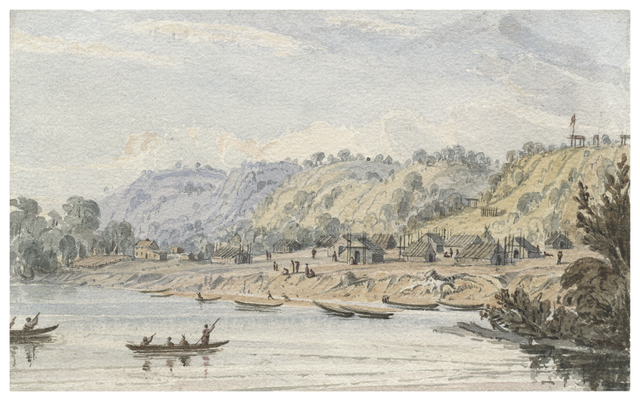
Kaposia village

On June 25, 1842, a war party of 100 Ojibwe men from the area around Lake St. Croix approached Kaposia for a retaliatory raid. At this time, Little Crow's village was located on the west side of the Mississippi River. Before crossing the river, however, the Ojibwe encountered two Dakota women working on a farm owned by Francois Gammel, one of the French Canadians who had settled on the east side of the Mississippi, about two miles south of Pig's Eye's trading post.

Gammel's wife and several Dakota, including Betsey's sister-in-law and nephew, were killed before Gammel finally reached his house and fired shots at the Ojibwe. According to one account, Betsey, who had been nearby with one of her brothers, heard the shots and signaled to the Kaposian villagers across the river to warn them of the attack by waving a blanket. The Dakota warriors then hurried across the river in their canoes, armed only with war spears because their guns had been hidden away during their medicine feast. Intoxicated and distracted by a decoy, their advance party headed into an ambush. After extended hand-to-hand combat, the Ojibwe finally retreated.

The Dakota casualties included at least twelve dead, with many more wounded, while the Ojibwe left behind four or five bodies on the field. Numerous accounts state that Betsey took part in pounding the heads of the dead attackers with a club, or in dismembering a dead man with a hatchet. Betsey's son Lightning Maker, who was fifteen years old at the time, later stated that one of his brothers had been killed in the attack, and that he had cut off a man's head to avenge his death.

Betsey's son Taopi was severely wounded in the Battle of Kaposia, which is also referred to as the Battle of Pine Coulie. Fur trader Henry Hastings Sibley, who was on the scene following the battle, wrote that he believed at the time that Taopi would die. Taopi survived. Although he had already been known as Taopi or “Wounded Man” previously, he became most famous for the heavy injuries he sustained in 1842.

== Canoe-related activities ==
In the early 1850s, Betsey often ferried people across the Mississippi River in her canoe. Although few details of her ferry business are available, there are many stories documenting her “excellent command of the waterway” over the years.

On May 25, 1839, Indian agent Lawrence Taliaferro noted in his journal that Jacob Fahlström had visited his office to report the loss of his bark canoe. Fahlström went to Little Crow's village and saw that “Betts, sister of the Rattler” had the canoe in her possession. Betsey had refused to return the canoe unless paid in 1 1/2 yards of stroud. Taliaferro noted that he planned to deal with retrieving the canoe the following Monday.

In November 1849, the Pioneer posted a notice that James M. Goodhue and Isaac N. Goodhue were applying for a license to operate a ferry at the lower landing in St. Paul. In response, on April 13, 1850, the Minnesota Chronicle and Register printed a newspaper advertisement in Betsey's name:

New Ferry. The subscriber would respectfully announce, that having procured from His Majesty Little Crow a license to keep a ferry, she is now prepared to carry passengers at the rates fixed by law, and for as much more as the public choose to give her. —‘Old Betsey.’ ‘The connecting link between the Indians and the whites’ N. B. — This Ferry is in opposition to Goodhue.

Also in 1850, Betsey rescued two white men who overturned their canoe near the steamboat landing in St. Paul. The men, Peter M. Caleff and D. W. Strickland, were partners in a shingle mill. Betsey and a boy, thought to be her grandson, were in a canoe nearby and spotted the men who had fallen into the water, struggling to stay afloat. They paddled vigorously toward the men and saved them from drowning, just as they were about to go under.

== Growing popularity in Saint Paul ==
During the 1840s there was a rapid demographic shift in the area around Saint Paul, as the white settler population outnumbered the nearby Mdewakantons for the first time. Old Bets became a popular and well-recognized figure in the vicinity of St. Paul and Mendota, who was often mentioned in the local newspapers. She was well known for her entrepreneurial spirit – asking for money and offering goods and services for sale. She was also one of the few Dakota women who were invited into settler homes to help with washing or housecleaning.

As biographer Mark Diedrich explains:

In the process of the awkward mingling of the Indian and white worlds, Betsey became a well-recognized figure to the early settlers. She was quite extroverted in personality, to the extent that she overcame the typical culturally-induced bashfulness and shyness of other Dakota women around white people. Betsey was also extremely industrious, even by Dakota standards. And furthermore, she was unabashedly straightforward when soliciting money or other goods.

=== Reputation for begging ===
Betsey was very forthright in asking strangers and acquaintances she knew for money. She would often ask for “kashpapi”, referring to a ten-cent coin. Historian J. Fletcher Williams wrote:

So she had become quite an institution in our midst. She subsisted by begging for many years. She was always welcome at the kitchen doors of the old settlers, and never failed to bear off a wallet of food. She was a privileged character in many ways, and no old settler (she knew them all) would refuse her request for kosh-poppy (money). She always greeted her acquaintances on the street with a broad grin of her huge mouth, and a cheerful "ho-ho."

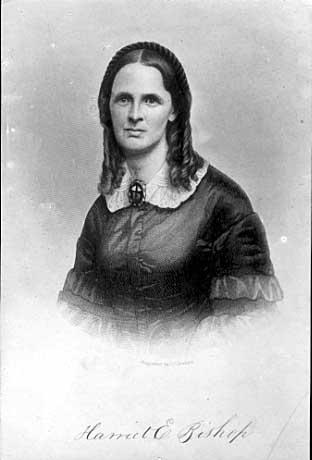
Harriet Bishop (c. 1860)

Harriet E. Bishop, a schoolteacher who moved to Saint Paul in 1847, wrote in her first book, Floral Home, about her annoyance with Betsey, whom she viewed as an “incorrigible beggar” – a trait she ascribed to all Indians. On one occasion, she recalled that Betsey had given her a seat in her canoe. Because Bishop didn't have money to pay her, Reverend Dr. Thomas Smith Williamson had paid on her behalf instead. Bishop saw that Betsey looked happy and thought that the debt had been settled. A few days later, however, Betsey called on her boarding house to demand full payment, which Bishop then paid. Betsey subsequently pursued Bishop on two more occasions, once when she was ill at her physician's office, to insist that Betsey had injured her arm and needed money.

On another occasion, Betsey was accused of stealing money by Eben Weld, a former government farmer at Kaposia village. Weld claimed that he was in Saint Paul with a handful of gold and silver coins in his pocket. When he discovered that the coins were missing, he demanded that Betsey return the coins. A physical struggle ensued, when trader William Henry Forbes appeared on the scene, along with one of Betsey's sons carrying a loaded pistol. The newspaper reported that Betsey's son would have shot Weld if Forbes had not intervened.

Diedrich explains that Betsey actually often begged for assistance on behalf of others. She was known to share what she received with other Indians, often giving away a greater share than what she kept, according to Dakota custom. Toward the end of her life, Henry Hastings Sibley noted that he tried to provide for her, only to find that she would quickly give everything away.

== Tragedy and mourning ==
Old Bets suffered many personal tragedies over her lifetime, and many descriptions of her acknowledge her visible pain when she was in mourning. In 1850 alone, at least three of her close family members died. These included her brother Rattler, who died of drinking bad whiskey; her brother Hinhdaku, who was killed in a fight with the Ojibwe; and one of her sons, who was killed in a high-profile incident with the Ojibwe. In 1853, Betsey's sister Scarlet Hill Woman was mortally wounded in a widely reported incident on one of the busiest streets of St. Paul.

=== Death of son in Ojibwe attack ===
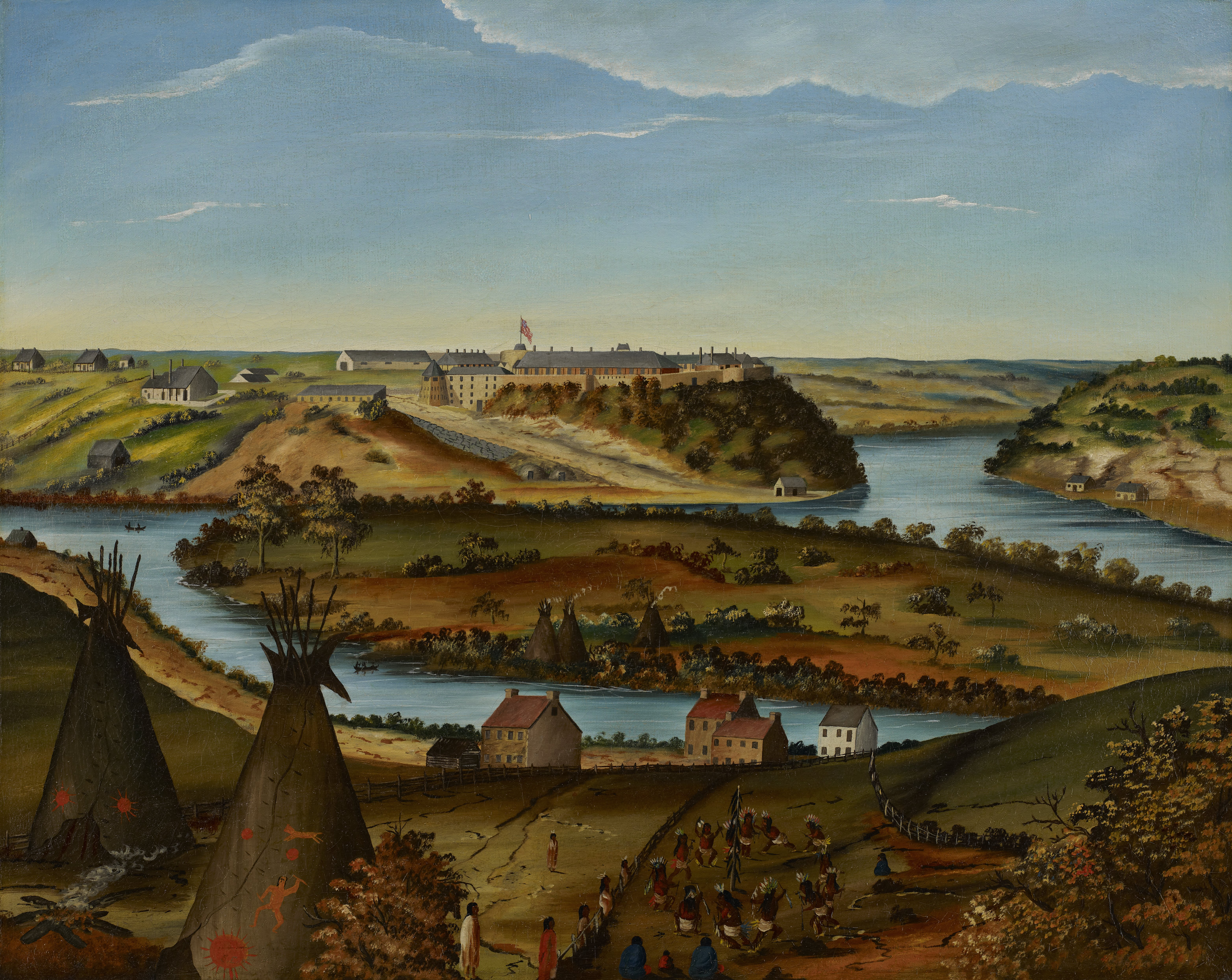
View of Fort Snelling from Mendota (c.1850)

On May 15, 1850, one of Betsey's sons was killed and scalped in an Ojibwe revenge attack. The attack was in retaliation for the Apple River massacre perpetrated by warriors from the Little Crow and Wakute bands the month before. Chief Hole-in-the-Day the Younger, who had been hiding in the Fountain Cave with several others, crossed the river and attacked a group of Dakota who had been walking in the woods below Mendota.

Chief Shakopee II, who had been visiting Little Crow's village at the time, implored Territorial Governor Alexander Ramsey to allow the Dakota to fight against the Ojibwe. Ramsey consented, promised provisions, and offered five dollars for every scalp they brought back. However, the Dakota were unable to find the killers and returned that evening with Betsey's son's body by canoe. As they carried his coffin from St. Paul toward Kaposia in a funeral procession, Harriet Bishop observed that Betsey “cut and mangled her person in token of genuine hearty mourning.”

Ramsey instructed Captain John B. Todd of Fort Ripley to arrest the two Ojibwe men and send them down to Fort Snelling. In June, however, Ramsey scheduled a peace council between the Dakota and Ojibwe chiefs involved, and the matter was dropped.

=== Shooting of sister in St. Paul ===
On the morning of April 27, 1853, a party of Ojibwe from Fond du Lac shot and mortally wounded one of Betsey's sisters in St. Paul. The shooting took place on one of the city's busiest streets, on the front steps of the American Fur Company’s Minnesota Outfit run by William Henry Forbes. The sister was most likely Scarlet Hill Woman. Betsey and her brother Jim had traveled with her by canoe from Kaposia village to St. Paul and were both with her at the time.

The Ojibwe tried to rush the store but were ordered to leave by Theodore Borup and two other men. Jim picked up a musket from the store, chased after the shooters, exchanged fire, and lost a splinter out of his wooden leg. Betsey and Jim took their wounded sister back to Kaposia, where she died a few hours later.

On Governor Ramsey’s orders, a platoon of dragoons was sent from Fort Snelling to pursue the retreating Ojibwe with the help of Taoyateduta Little Crow and two of his warriors. They overtook the Ojibwe war party near St. Croix Falls, where Lieutenant W. B. McGruder shot and killed one of the men; another man was captured. Little Crow took the dead man's scalp which he later turned over to McGruder, who showed it to people in Fort Snelling. Ironically, Ramsey then jailed Little Crow and his men for taking the scalp.

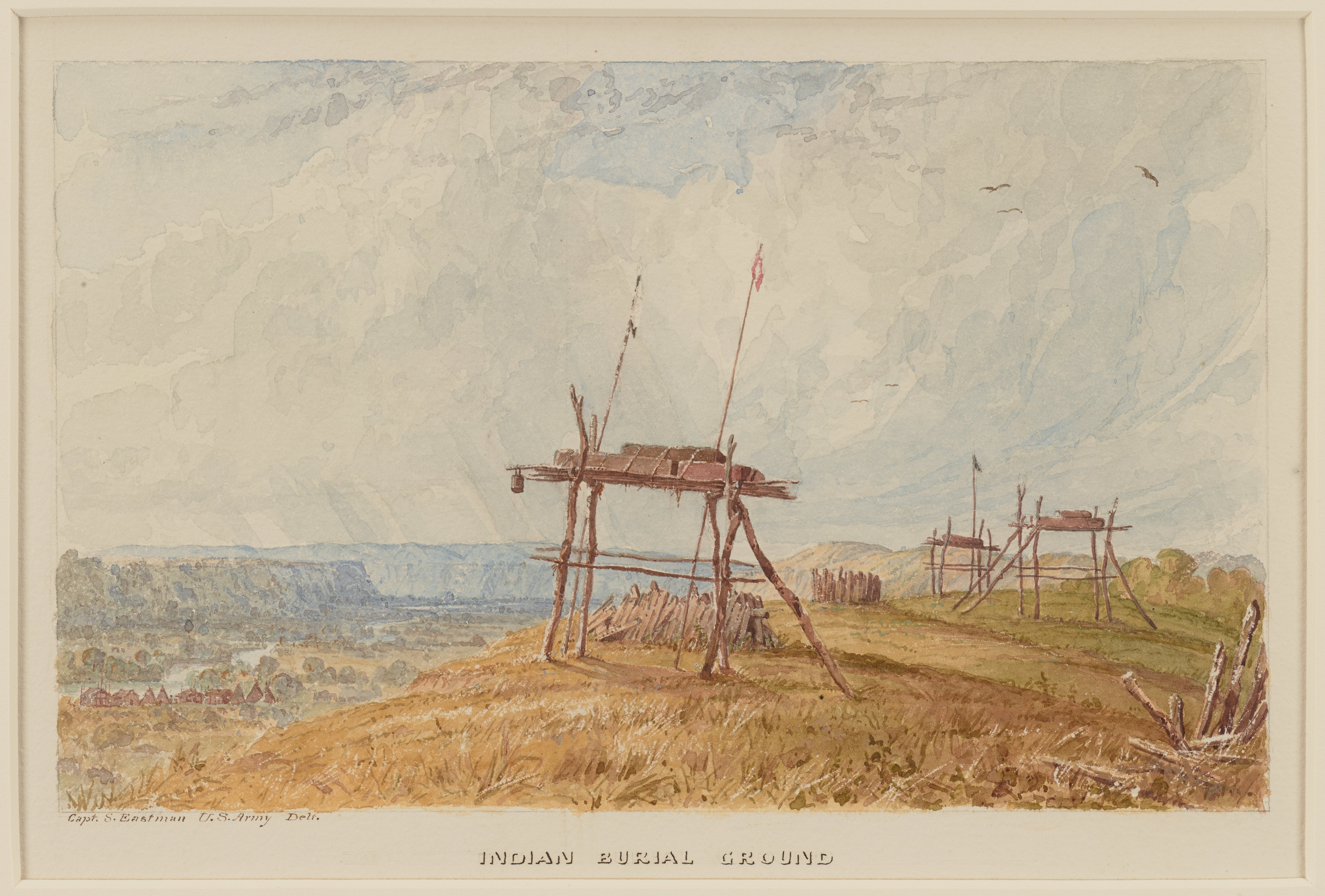
Dakota burial ground

Scarlet Hill Woman's corpse was placed in a coffin and raised on a scaffold behind the village. Her coffin was covered with a red cloth, with a piece of the Ojibwe scalp suspended above it, believed to help the soul in the spirit-land. The following day, a passenger in a steamboat passing Kaposia saw the villagers in a very public display of mourning:

The whole village of several hundred Indians was in sight and a most frightful sight it was. Everyone, young and old, was running about crying, wailing with faces black and white… It was such an appalling spectacle that the captain deemed it best not to land.

On June 9, 1853, an editorial in the Minnesota Pioneer argued that the Ojibwe attack on the Dakota in St. Paul demonstrated that it made sense to remove the Dakota west to the reservations which were being prepared for their arrival.

== Removal to reservation ==
In October 1853, Betsey and her family reached the new reservation lands bordering the Minnesota River, initially congregating at Belle Plaine. They were among the 2,300 Mdewakanton and Wahpekute Dakotas who were required to leave their villages, according to the 1851 Treaty of Mendota with the United States, a land cession treaty which had been signed by Chief Little Crow and other Dakota leaders. However, it was clear that the reservation was far from ready for their arrival. Although government farmers had started breaking land, the warehouses they had been promised had not yet been built, and they lacked sufficient provisions for the Dakota to live.

Back in St. Paul, Betsey and her brother Jim were genuinely missed. Editor James Goodhue wrote in the Minnesota Pioneer on October 27, 1853:

Although we know that the prosperity of the white settlements, as well as the comfort of the Indians, demanded their withdrawal from among the whites, yet the reflection that they ‘have passed away’ is forced upon our minds. We miss many familiar faces. ‘One Legged Jim’ and his sister ‘Old Bets’ who had almost become identified with our town, are no longer to be seen.

=== Seasonal migration ===
The Dakota received an annuity payment for giving up their land, which was initially distributed in the form of cash rather than food. Although many were able to purchase food from traders, they could not buy enough to get them through the winter. After collecting their annuity payments from Indian agent Robert G. Murphy, most Dakota bands scattered to spend the winter in a campground of their choosing.

In May 1854, Betsey visited St. Paul together with chiefs Little Crow III and Shakopee II. The Daily Minnesotian observed that she was regarded as much as a celebrity as the chiefs. In an interview, Betsey told a reported that she was now “white” and living like a white person. In fact, she had become involved in the trade of transporting goods to the western Dakota tribes, in exchange for horses or buffalo skins. This trade had previously been undertaken by white and mixed-blood fur traders, as well as Chief Little Crow himself, for decades.

Although several hundred acres of ground had been broken near the Redwood Agency, in the summer of 1854, most of the cropland remained fallow because agent Murphy had failed to order seed for planting. Furthermore, Indian agent Murphy had allowed provisions stored at the agency to spoil. In October 1854, the agents called the Dakota to distribute annuity funds, but had only limited rations available and resorted to distributing spoiled flour and pork.

The Dakota were thus left to fend for themselves. The Mdewakantons were often seen in the white settlements, begging or stealing food items. After returning to the reserve to pick up their annuity payments, they would roam the “Big Woods” north of the Minnesota River to hunt deer, taking a circuitous route through their old territory around St. Paul. Their continued reliance on hunting also led to skirmishes with the Ojibwe.

In January 1855, much to the surprise of the citizens of Saint Paul, several hundred Mdewakantons converged in front of the Central House in a grand “scalp dance.” Betsey was seen as a central figure in at least one of those dances. Traditionally, the scalp dances gave Dakota women in particular a way to grieve loved ones who had been killed in warfare and express their anger. Historian Gary Clayton Anderson writes that in the 1850s, Dakota skirmishes with the Ojibwe followed by scalp dances “seemed at times to be a way of venting anger brought on by the failures on the reservations and by the growing intrusion of white farmers on old hunting grounds.”

== Start of photographic modeling career ==
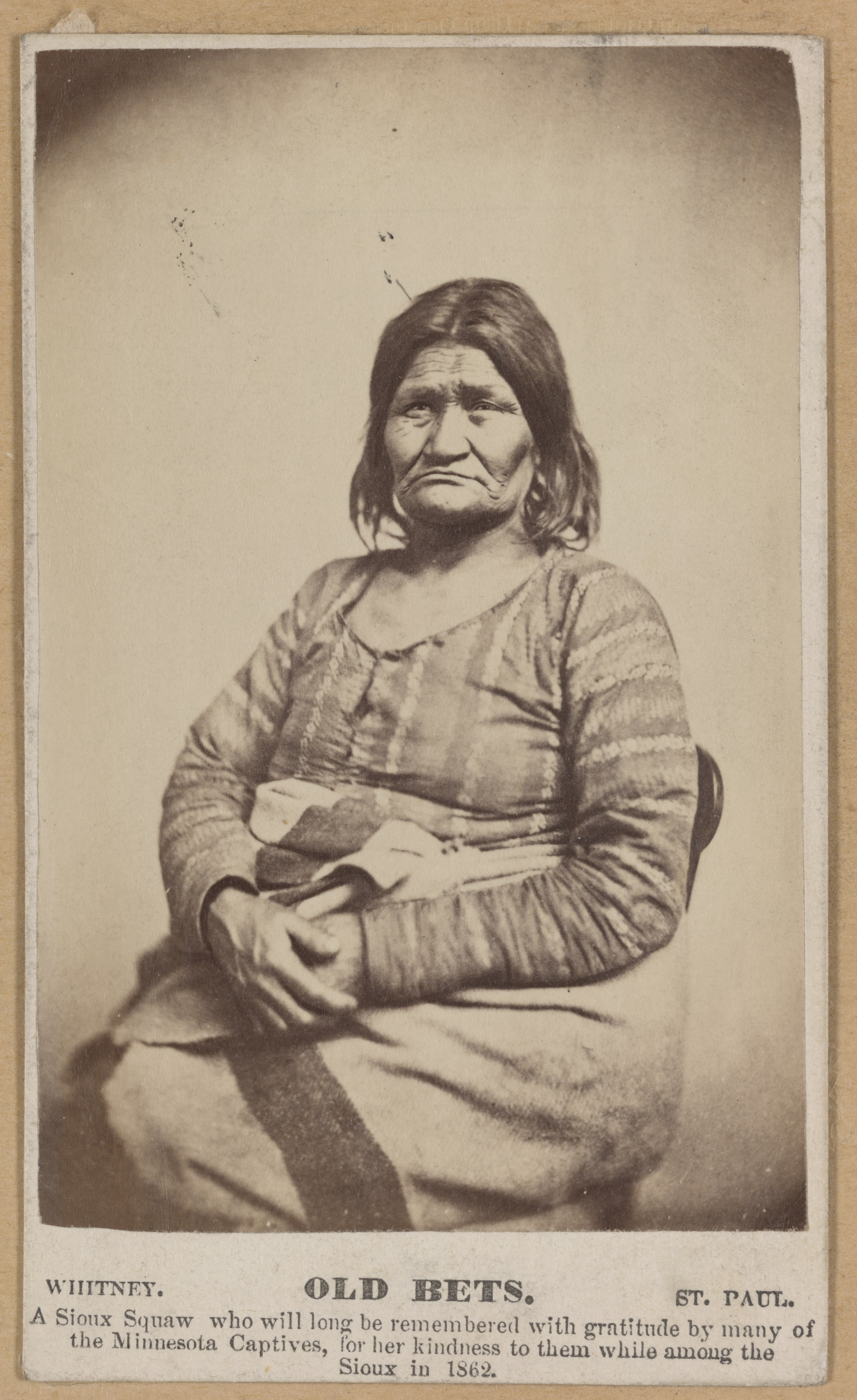
Carte-de-visite of "Old Bets" by Joel E. Whitney published after the war

By 1859, Betsey's son Lightning Maker had moved with his wife and children to Faribault, joining a small community of Dakota and “mixed-bloods” who had chosen to remain there. Betsey started to visit Faribault more regularly, and was often seen asking the villagers for food. She would then continue on to St. Paul before returning to the reservation, walking hundreds of miles by foot.

It was during these visits to St. Paul that Betsey was first invited to be photographed at Joel Whitney's studio. By this time, the Dakota were rarely seen in St. Paul, and Old Bets was probably seen in St. Paul more often than any other Dakota. Whitney is thought to have paid her in some form for sitting for her portrait, which he displayed in his gallery and printed for sale in the form of cartes-de-visite starting in 1861.

The portrait of “Old Bet, a Sioux squaw” is mentioned in the April 15, 1862 issue of the American Journal of Photography in New York, as one of Joel Whitney's “very fine card photographs.” Whitney had submitted Betsey's portrait along with a portrait titled “Dacotah Dandy.” The journal observed: “The ‘Dandy’ is evidently ‘got up’ at great expense, with eagle's plume, earrings, braided hair, beads, skins of animals, &c.; the Dandy is quite in contrast to ‘Old Bet’ who is not at all ornamental.”

The mythology of Old Bets as “the ancient Dakota” started to grow. During her long absences, citizens of St. Paul started to speculate that she had died. When she returned, the local newspapers would publish reports of recent sightings saying, “She ain’t dead yet.” Biographer Diedrich writes:

Then, when she reappeared, they considered that she must be extremely aged. This was partly gathered from her appearance when in mourning, partly from their own exaggerations – oftentimes to get a laugh at her expense, and partly because Betsey also spoke of herself as being very old.

== Son Taopi and the farmer movement ==
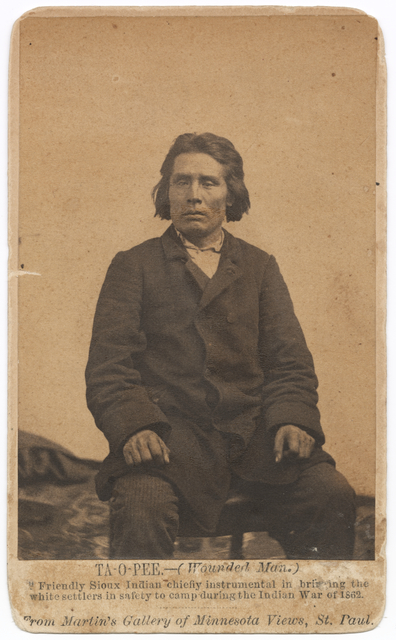
Taopi in 1862

In 1858, Betsey's son Taopi had left Little Crow's band to join the “farmer band” of Dakota at the Redwood Agency. In 1860, Taopi was persuaded by Henry Benjamin Whipple, the Episcopal bishop of Minnesota who had been visiting the reservation, to cut his hair.

In May 1861, the new Indian agent, Thomas Galbraith, appointed Taopi as “chief of farmers,” replacing White Dog, and promised him a salary of $500. Taopi was most likely recommended by his kinsman and friend, trader William Henry Forbes, for the job.

As head of the farmers, Taopi found himself in the midst of a growing schism among the Mdewakanton Dakota between the “farmers” who had cut their hair and converted to Christianity, and the “hunters” who continued medicine dances and were seen as “traditionalists.” Anger against the government farming program grew as it became clear that funds owed to the Dakota for giving up their lands had been misappropriated by Indian agents and traders.

In June 1862, Taopi's children became ill and two of them died; Betsey was in mourning for the deaths of her grandchildren. Taopi was criticized by medicine society members that he was being punished for being tempted by Christianity. Taopi nevertheless was baptized by Reverend Samuel Hinman in early August 1862.

== Visits to Fort Ridgely ==
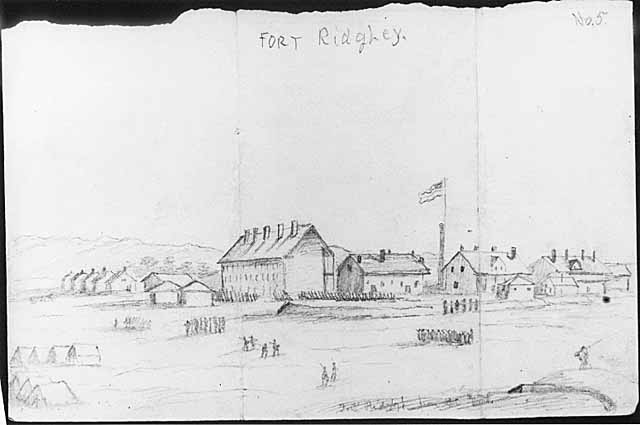
Fort Ridgely in 1862

Betsey made frequent trips to Fort Ridgely to forage for food, after construction of the fort was completed in 1854. There are several accounts of her interaction with the soldiers and families at Fort Ridgely in 1861 and 1862.

Oscar G. Wall, a member of Captain John Marsh's company stationed at Fort Ridgely, described Betsey picking food items out of the swill barrel outside the barracks kitchen. She would take vegetables and discarded bread into her skirt, which she used as a basket. Wall wrote that the soldiers were generally kindly disposed to her, but nonetheless delighted in annoying her because she was “cross and irritable.” On occasion, she would fling a cold potato at a taunting soldier and say, “Se-chee,” meaning “Bad.” Wall described her as:

Old Betz, a squaw everywhere renowned for her great age, which was said to be at the time…120 years. No trader’s or pioneer’s memory could recall when she was not old. She was not very tall of stature, but was quite fleshy. Her attire was not catchy, and her hair, in appearance had not been combed for years. She was a child of the simple life. She lived close to nature and was an economist.

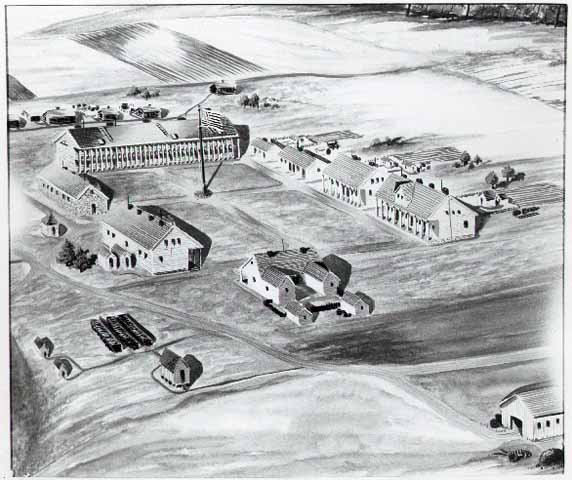
Fort Ridgely in 1862

As of 1861, there were 100 men stationed at Fort Ridgely; only a few of them were there with their families. Stories about the interaction between “Old Betts” and the soldiers’ wives illustrate the cultural misunderstandings that often ensued.

In one account, Margueret Hern recalled that she wanted “a little lock of Indian hair to show…how coarse an Indians’ hair was” to enclose in a letter to her mother. She approached “Old Betts” with scissors and tried to cut some of her hair. Betsey “jumped away screaming and acting like a crazy woman.” Much later, when Betsey peered through her window to ask for money, Hern held up a mirror to her face to show how she looked “with her hair straggling all over,” not realizing that many Dakota women believed that looking in a mirror would cause death. Hern stated: “When she saw the reflection, she was so mad she tried to break the glass.”

Margaret A. Snider recalled another incident that occurred during a trade with Betsey:

Old Betts came in to sell moccasins. I asked her to make some for my baby and showed her a piece of pork and some sugar I would give her for it. She brought them later. We had eaten that piece of pork and I got another piece which was larger but not the same, of course. When she saw it was not the same, she said “Cheatey Squaw, Cheatey Squaw,” and was very angry. I then gave her the pork and two bowls of sugar instead of one and she went away. Later I saw her in the next room where another family lived and said, “Aunt Bets called me Cheatey Squaw…” Quick as a flash, she drew a long wicked looking knife from her belt and ran for me and it was only by fleeing and locking my own door that I escaped. She was never again allowed on the reservation.”

In early August 1862, a large party of Dakota – numbering between 50 and 100 people – went to Fort Ridgely to perform dances with the objective of soliciting money from the soldiers. After the outbreak of war nearly three weeks later, the Fort Ridgely soldiers and their families would reflect that the Dakota led by Cut Nose might have been using the visit as a “tour of inspection” or warning dance prior to the outbreak. Wall noted that Betsey was present during the dances.

== U.S.–Dakota War of 1862 ==
=== Kindness toward captive women and children ===
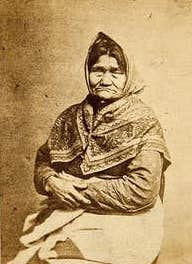
Old Bets (c.1862)

One of the most frequently cited facts about Old Bets is that she was remembered fondly for her kindness in taking care of the white captives during the Dakota War of 1862. During the first few days of the uprising, which started on August 18, Little Crow and his followers took a large number of white and mixed-blood women and children captive. The hostages were initially in the custody of their captors, but as the weeks went by, some were quietly “adopted” away into Dakota families who tried to protect them, while others remained trapped in dire conditions.

Although Taopi's role in saving the hostages is well known, Betsey's specific role in assisting the captives is undocumented. Betsey's sister-in-law, Hazatonwin, however, is mentioned in Samuel J. Brown’s memoirs as “Aunt Judy.” Hazatonwin is credited for making sure that his family had enough to eat and for putting them under her protection, before the Brown family was rescued and taken under the protection of their Wahpeton stepgrandfather, Akipa.

=== Taopi and the Peace Coalition ===
A week after the Battle of Birch Coulee, Taopi, Good Thunder (Wakinyanwaste) and Chief Wabasha managed to smuggle a letter to Colonel Henry Hastings Sibley, letting him know that they were opposed to Little Crow and wished to help the whites. They received a letter back from Sibley instructing them to wait for his arrival and to save as many prisoners as they could.

George Spencer, one of the few male hostages, told the other captives that Taopi would save them. Taopi said that they then “came flocking to our tepees like pigeons,” after which he distributed the captives among his friends. Biographer Mark Diedrich suggests that some of the captives then found shelter with his mother Betsey.

While Chief Little Crow and his men were fighting in the Battle of Wood Lake, Taopi, Good Thunder, Iron Shield, His Thunder, Stone Man, and Paul Mazakutemani stayed back at camp and rescued the captives, while also instructing them to dig trenches in their tepees in case of attack. Taopi, Paul and His Thunder sent a second message to Sibley urging him to come to their camp quickly, as they felt that they and the captives were still in danger.

=== Camp Release ===
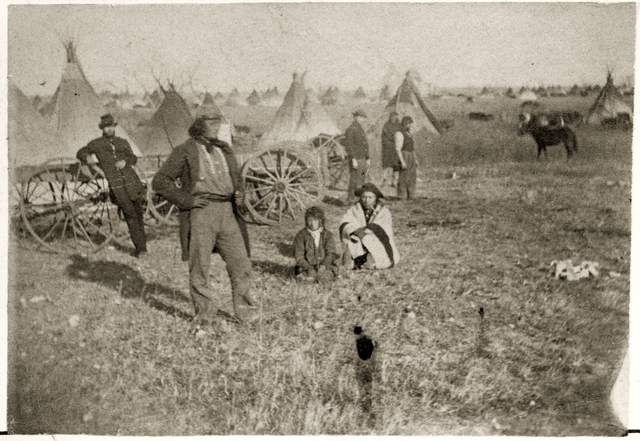
Camp Release

On September 26, 1862, the "peaceful" Dakota immediately released 241 captives to Colonel Henry Hastings Sibley upon his arrival at their camp. The presence of “Old Betz” at Camp Release staring at the soldiers during the handover is noted in numerous accounts.

In his narrative of the war, U.S. veteran Thomas Watts noted that Betsey was instantly recognizable and was also given free rein to move around their camp:

Any written article pertaining to that expedition would not be complete without mentioning the name of Old Betz. Old Betz was just a homely old squaw, between 50 and 60 years of age. What she had done to immortalize herself is rather beyond my ken, but in those old days any picture gallery in Minnesota without a likeness of Old Betz adorning its walls would be decidedly behind times, and some of the histories as well displayed her picture…It was claimed at the time that she had been very kind to the white women and children that had fallen into the hands of the savages. Like many white people of lowly station in life, she had the faculty of ingratiating herself into a higher strata of society than she naturally belonged; hence, she was allowed absolute freedom of our camp, whereas the other women and children were denied that privilege. She could talk some English, at least enough to be understood in plain matters.

=== Trials ===
Betsey was often said to have testified as a witness against the Dakota men who were found guilty of committing crimes during the war. However, her name does not appear in any of the trial records as a witness. Her son Taopi did testify as a witness in both the prosecution and defense of members of his band.

On October 29, Betsey's son Shooting Star was tried for his participation in the attack on Fort Ridgely. He insisted he only went because the hostiles had threatened to kill his wife and children if he did not go, and also stated that he did not want to fire his gun in New Ulm because his brother Lightning Maker was living “in the Dutch settlements.” It is unknown what became of Shooting Star after the trials. Diedrich presumes that he was imprisoned at Camp McClellan and probably died of disease before 1866.

== Internment at Fort Snelling ==
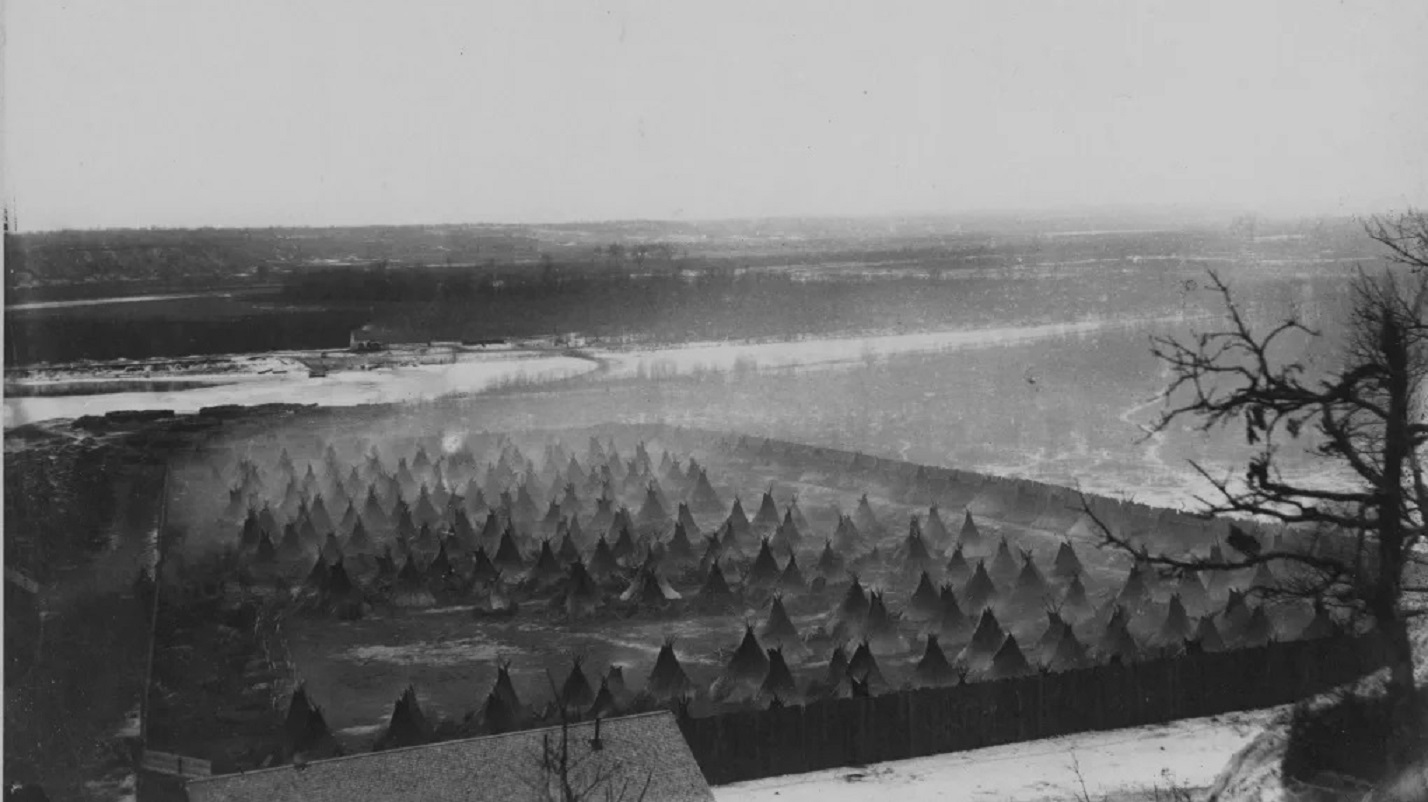
Internment compound at Fort Snelling

On November 7, 1,658 Dakota non-combatants, including a large number of women and children, were sent to an internment compound at Fort Snelling. These included Betsey, her mother, her sister Ellen, and her daughters.

Harriet Bishop McConkey visited the encampment at Fort Snelling at least once. She was one of many daily visitors who obtained “passes” from the fort commander to observe the “disgustingly filthy sight” of hundreds of tepees that had been enclosed inside a stockade to protect them from attack by angry settlers, as much as to keep them in.

In a chapter on “The Removal of the Good Indians to Fort Snelling,” Bishop McConkey described seeing Betsey there, as well as Taopi and Chief Wabasha. Regarding Betsey, she said:

[Betsey] is seen in every Photograph gallery in the land, and readily recognized by every street urchin. Everywhere she has warm personal friends, and it is her proud boast that none of her family have taken part in the raid against the whites. Even she, old as she is, was pattering around barefooted, as lithe as a girl of sixteen.

Much to McConkey's surprise, Betsey kissed her hand when they parted – a gesture she most likely picked up from her white contacts.

=== Conviction and reprieve for son-in-law ===
Betsey's son-in-law, Round Wind, was among the 39 men condemned to execution, on the basis of a German boy's testimony that he had killed his mother. Round Wind was baptized by Reverend Dr. Thomas Smith Williamson and sent word to his relatives not to mourn him; he thought he was likely to be “saved” given that he was innocent of shedding any white man's blood. On December 25, Round Wind was given a last-minute reprieve by General Sibley on the basis of his age, as well as new evidence that the actual perpetrators of the murders he had been accused of had escaped with Little Crow.

== Move to Faribault ==
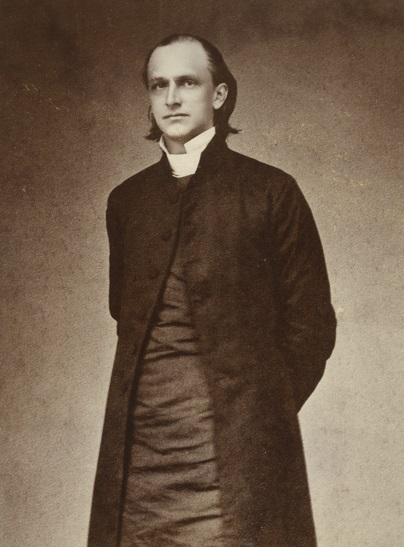
Rev. Henry Benjamin Whipple (1860)

In May 1863, 1,318 Dakota non-combatants who had been interned at Fort Snelling were removed from Minnesota on steamships carrying them to Crow Creek Reservation. Taopi was among the seven or eight Dakota and mixed-blood men who were allowed to remain in Minnesota, together with their families. Taopi requested that his mother Betsey be allowed to stay behind with him. The request was granted by General Henry Hastings Sibley.

However, Betsey's mother, Grey Face Woman, was sent into exile, and was among the 300 women and children who died on board the steamship. The steamers were overcrowded, with little food, and rampant illness. The death of Grey Face Woman at our near St. Joseph, Missouri was then misreported as the death of Betsey, resulting in the first of many premature obituaries of Old Betz to be published in the St. Paul newspapers.

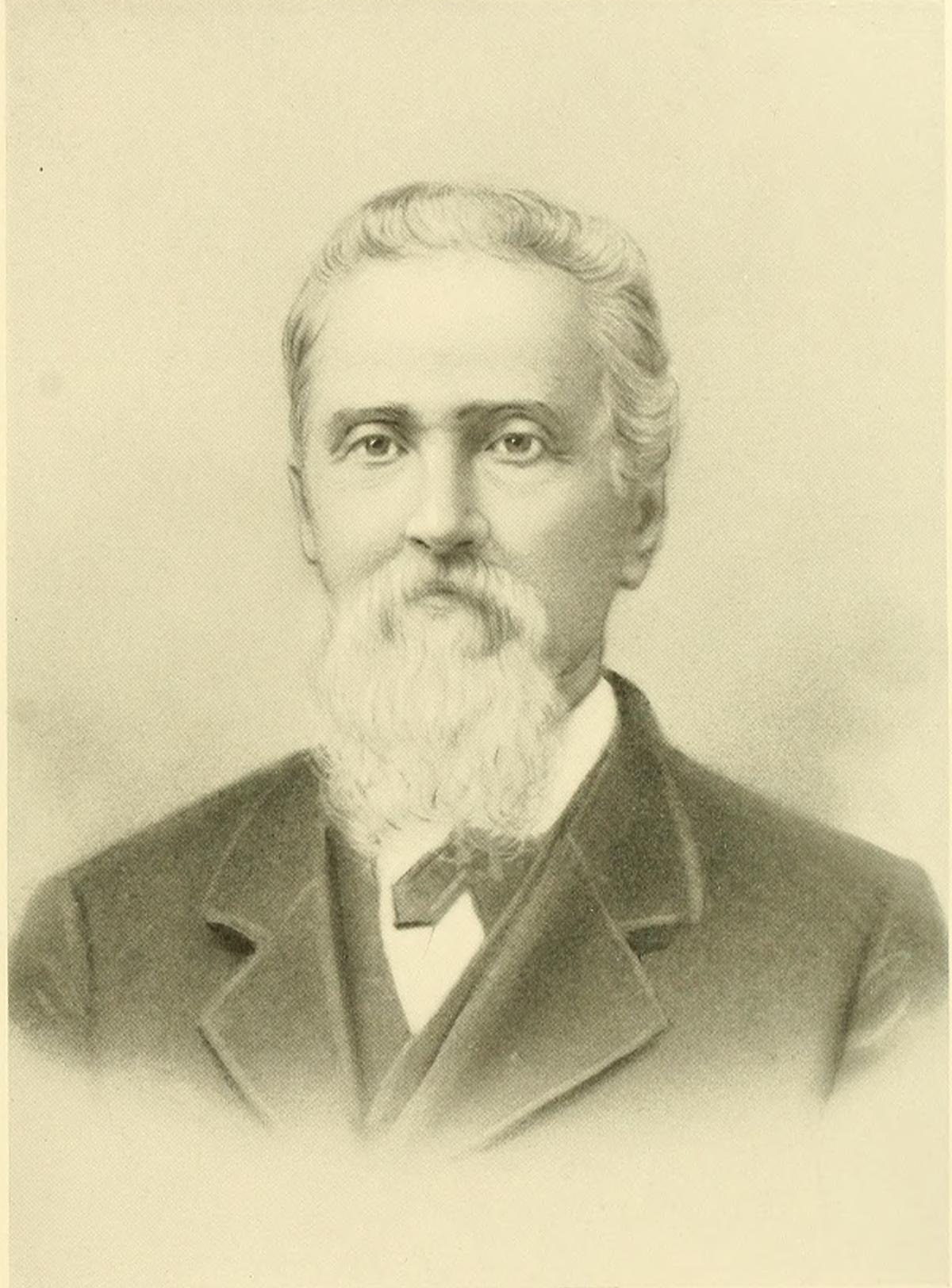
Alexander Faribault

When Taopi and the other Dakota scouts joined General Sibley's expedition to fight “hostile” Dakotas in the northern plains, Bishop Henry Benjamin Whipple intervened to seek relief for the scouts’ families who had been left behind, including Betsey. Sibley responded to Whipple that the Dakota families would be sent to the Missouri River, due to strong opposition among Minnesotans to allow a single Dakota to remain within the state. Whipple assured him that he would find a way to take care of the Dakota, and approached trader Alexander Faribault for help. Faribault offered the use of part of his land to house an Indian camp.

Some of the townspeople of Faribault were opposed to the Dakota living amongst them, but Alexander Faribault wrote to the local newspaper assuring them that he was not harboring “guilty Indians.” Life in Faribault was hard for the Dakotas, and they were often forced to rely on handouts from Whipple and Faribault.

Over subsequent years, they attempted to farm with help from Reverend Samuel Hinman, but a flood in 1865 resulted in a crop failure. The Dakotas then switched to digging ginseng, which they sold to a buyer in Faribault, who had it packaged in St. Paul for shipment to China.

== Trips to St. Paul ==
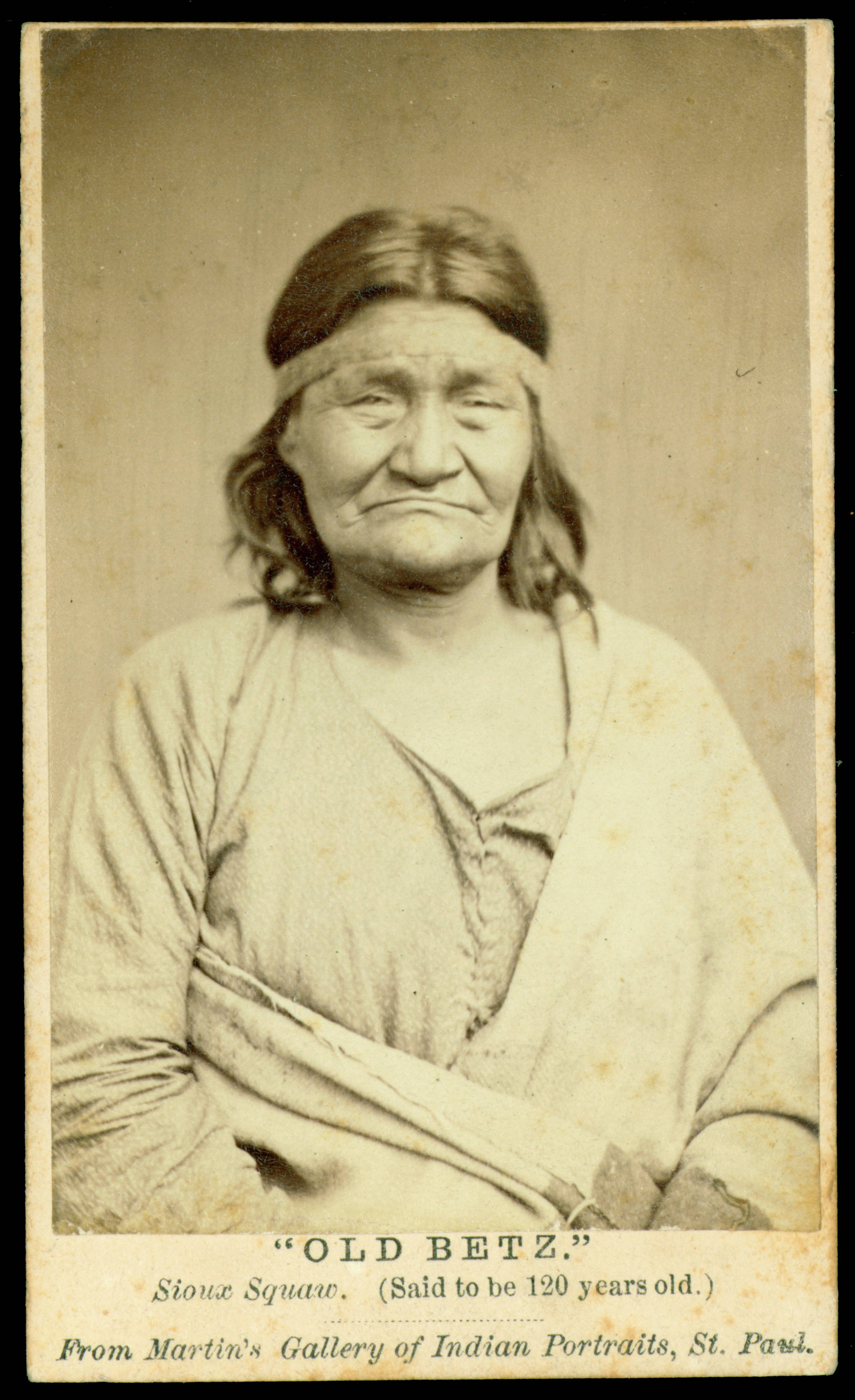
Carte-de-visite by Martin's Gallery reads, "'OLD BETZ.' Sioux Squaw. Said to be 120 years old."

Two weeks after the executions of Little Six and Medicine Bottle on November 11, 1865, Old Bets arrived in St. Paul to a warm welcome. The local newspapers celebrated her return to the city after two-and-a-half years.

She continued to be highly in demand for sittings, as photographers in St. Paul sought to cash in on sales of “Old Betz” carte-de-visite prints. In addition to Joel Whitney, who had started the trend in 1861, other photographers who printed and sold Old Bets portraits included William H. Illingworth, Charles A. Zimmerman, M.C. Tuttle, and James Edgar Martin.

In 1866, Whitney reported that he had sold tens of thousands cartes-de-visite of Betsey, even to collectors in Europe. Captions on many of the photo cards repeated that she was a "Sioux squaw" who was supposedly 120 years old. The photographs of Betsey taken during this time show that she had lost most of her teeth, contributing to her “aged” look. Many included captions about her kindness toward captives during the Dakota War of 1862.

In the summer of 1868, Betsey visited St. Paul often and pitched her tepee in Mendota for months. She sold wild fruit and other items to her friends. Betsey also went from house to house to beg for food from the residents of St. Paul, who were said to be very charitable toward her. She was often seen carrying large sacks of food back to her campsite in Mendota.

Meanwhile, Betsey became even more of a celebrity as books were published prominently featuring her name and image. Colonel C. Hankins dedicated a whole chapter to “Betsey” in his book, Dakota Land, or the Beauty of St. Paul, which was published in 1868. He described an extensive dream sequence in which he spoke to Betsey.

On one occasion, she visited Harriet Bishop in her home. Bishop recalled that she opened her latest book and showed Betsey her portrait. In response, Betsey “drew her face into the most horrid contortions, and hurriedly ran her fingers through her hair, to bristle it up still more if possible, signifying she looked that way in the picture…she uttered a low gutteral sound, and ended with ‘Ah, too bad! Too bad!”

Betsey returned to Faribault, but she and her family struggled through the winter of 1868–1869. Taopi's health was rapidly deteriorating due to tuberculosis. Bets nevertheless appeared once again in St. Paul in January 1869 looking for food, and Taopi himself went on a hunting expedition north of St. Paul, despite his illness.

Taopi died of tuberculosis on February 18, 1869.

== Move to Mendota ==
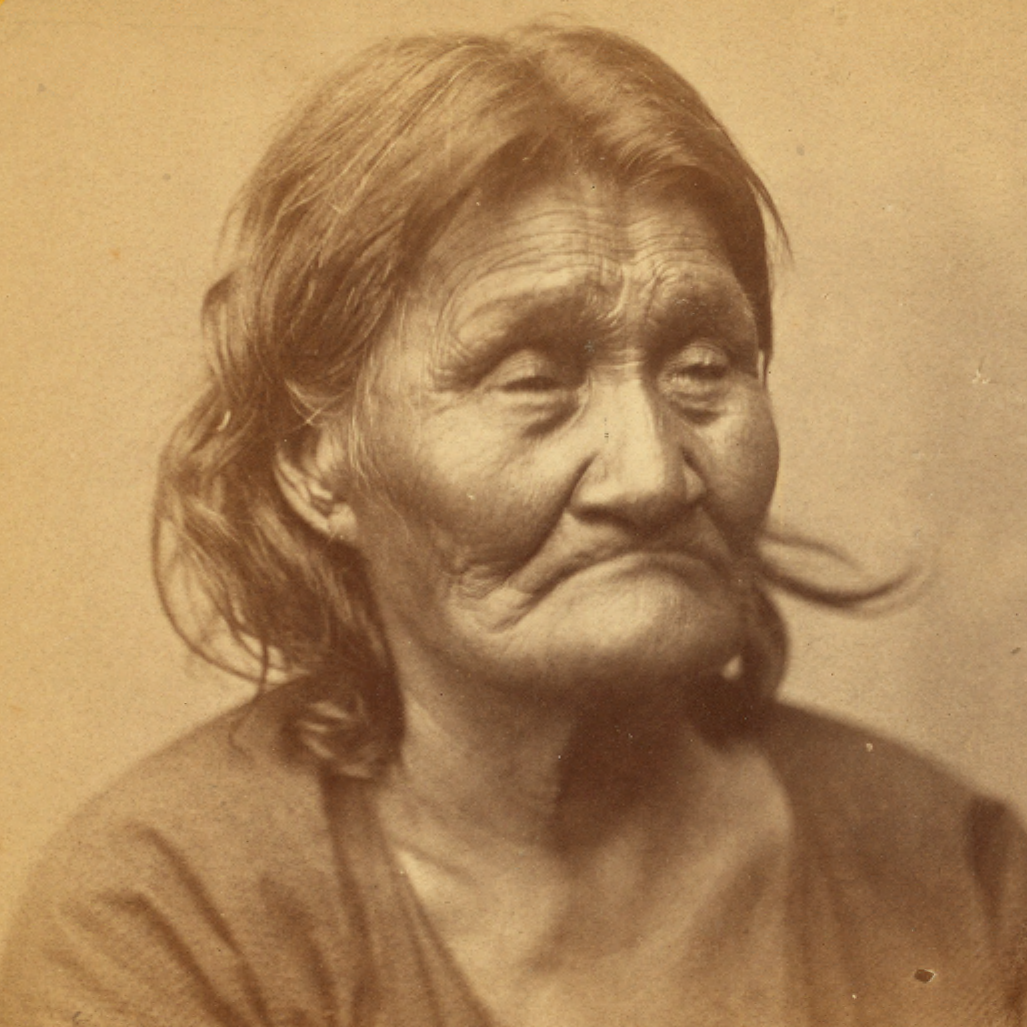
"Old Bets, 120 years old" by Charles A. Zimmerman

In 1869, Betsey and about twenty of the former Dakota residents of Faribault moved to Mendota. In addition to Betsey, it included three of her daughters; Lightning Maker, his wife, and their son; Betsey's niece and children, and Rattler's daughter.

In July 1869, Betsey again visited Harriet Bishop in her home. Bishop wrote that Betsey broke into tears and collapsed, crying, “Me pappoose dead! Me pappoose dead… Taopi – aye, aye, Taopi, dead.” Bishop was moved by Betsey's grief and worried about her health. She then wrote an article in the Minnesota Pupil arguing that as a “centenarian,” Betsey was a gift to the community regardless of her race, and deserved charity and assistance in her final years.

Betsey and her relatives moved onto land owned by Henry Hastings Sibley, who had retired from the military and was serving as president of the St. Paul Gas Company. Their encampment in Mendota became a tourist attraction. In 1873, the St. Paul Pioneer wrote that it was visited by hundreds of tourists each summer who wanted to observe Indian life without exposing themselves to danger.

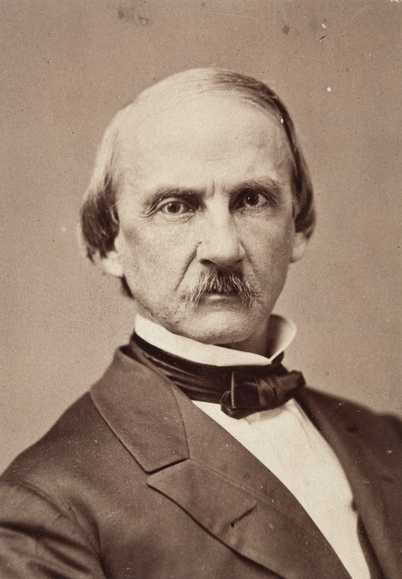
Henry Hastings Sibley in 1870

Betsey and her family took on a wide variety of activities to survive. Lightning Maker went hunting, and the family speared and skinned several hundred muskrats each season. The women made moccasins and mittens, and sold them to dealers in St. Paul. They dug ginseng, planted crops on Sibley's land, and gathered wild rice. Betsey continued to go to St. Paul to trade and ask for food and money. By the 1870s, she was seen walking with a cane:

[She] has often appeared on our streets, with her long cane, bowing and smiling and begging, and usually she has carried back to Mendota, where she resided on property owned by General Sibley, the kind offerings of her friends. Sometimes she would appear with a dilapidated bonnet, or some cast-off garment of civilization, which uniting with the ever-present blanket of barbarism, presented a unique appearance and attracted general attention…

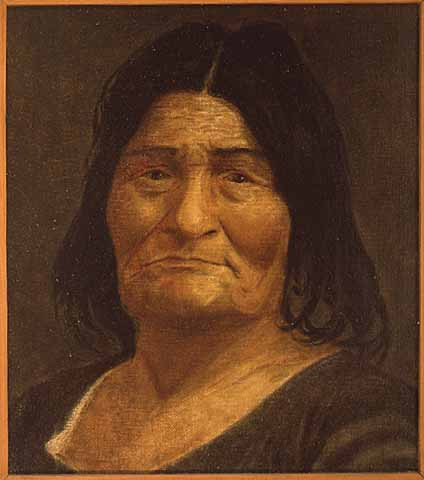
"Old Bets" painting by Andrew Falkenshield

Betsey was said to have been very proud of her fame and sought to capitalize on the attention she received from tourists by asking for money. She continued to be pursued for photographs, even more than the most famous Dakota chiefs.

Around 1870, Andrew Falkenshield, a Danish immigrant and former photographer, did an oil painting of Betsey. It is not known whether Betsey sat for the portrait or if he worked from a photograph. At some point, Judge Charles E. Flandrau acquired the painting, which was donated in 1902 to the Minnesota Historical Society.

Betsey became so famous that in January 1871, the Munger Brothers of St. Paul published the “Old Betz Song,” with words by J. H. Hanson and music by Frank Wood.

== Final years and death ==
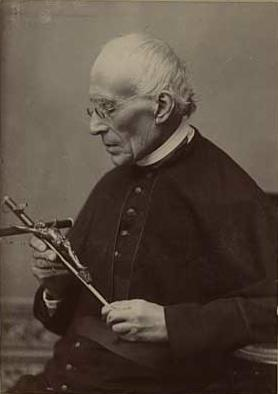
Father Augustin Ravoux

In the fall of 1871, Betsey was unwell and was rumored to be near death. During her suffering, she called for Father Augustin Ravoux rather than the Episcopal missionaries for spiritual support. Father Ravoux suggested that she be baptized. On October 8, 1871, Betsey was baptized at the Catholic Church of St. Peter's in Mendota as “Betsey Mary St. Clair.” This was the only time she was recorded using the surname “St. Clair.”

Soon afterward, several obituaries started to appear in St. Paul newspapers. Later, when it became apparent that Betsey was still alive, the St. Paul newspapers were widely derided for their error. On October 20, the Faribault Democrat wrote: “Old Betz, whom the papers of this portion of Minnesota have recently killed and buried, is reported still living and quite healthy. Don’t distribute your obituaries, gentlemen, for she may die.”

In October 1871, Father Ravoux visited Betsey again and felt that she was finally near death. He reported this to his contacts in St. Paul, who proceeded to publish an “almost obituary.” On March 2, 1872, another premature obituary was published in Harper's Weekly in New York City.

In July 1872, Henry Hastings Sibley spoke to the St. Paul Chamber of Commerce about his concerns for Betsey's worsening condition. He explained that she had become so disabled from rheumatism that she was confined to her “shanty” on his land and was distressed that she could no longer go out to make a living. Although he had provided for her for many years, he was struggling to continue to take care of her. He had also appealed to Dakota County officials, who said that charity to Indians was not within their remit. Sibley, who was then president of the Chamber of Commerce, asked for donations on her behalf and collected $63.60, which he passed on to Father Patrick F. Glennon.

On April 26, 1873, an unnamed “Mendota correspondent” reported that Betsey had finally died. The St. Paul Dispatch was reluctant to be wrong again and sent their “most reliable reporter” to verify the news. The Pioneer expressed skepticism but finally published their own obituary on May 1, 1873. Historians at the time were also convinced of her death. However, biographer Mark Diedrich devotes an entire chapter exploring the possibility that Betsey lived on for another 10 years, based on the fact that her name is on a list of Mdewakantons in Minnesota receiving payments in 1885. Although many biographical sketches of Betsey state that she was given a Christian burial, her final resting place remains unknown.

== Gallery ==
Stereoscopic views
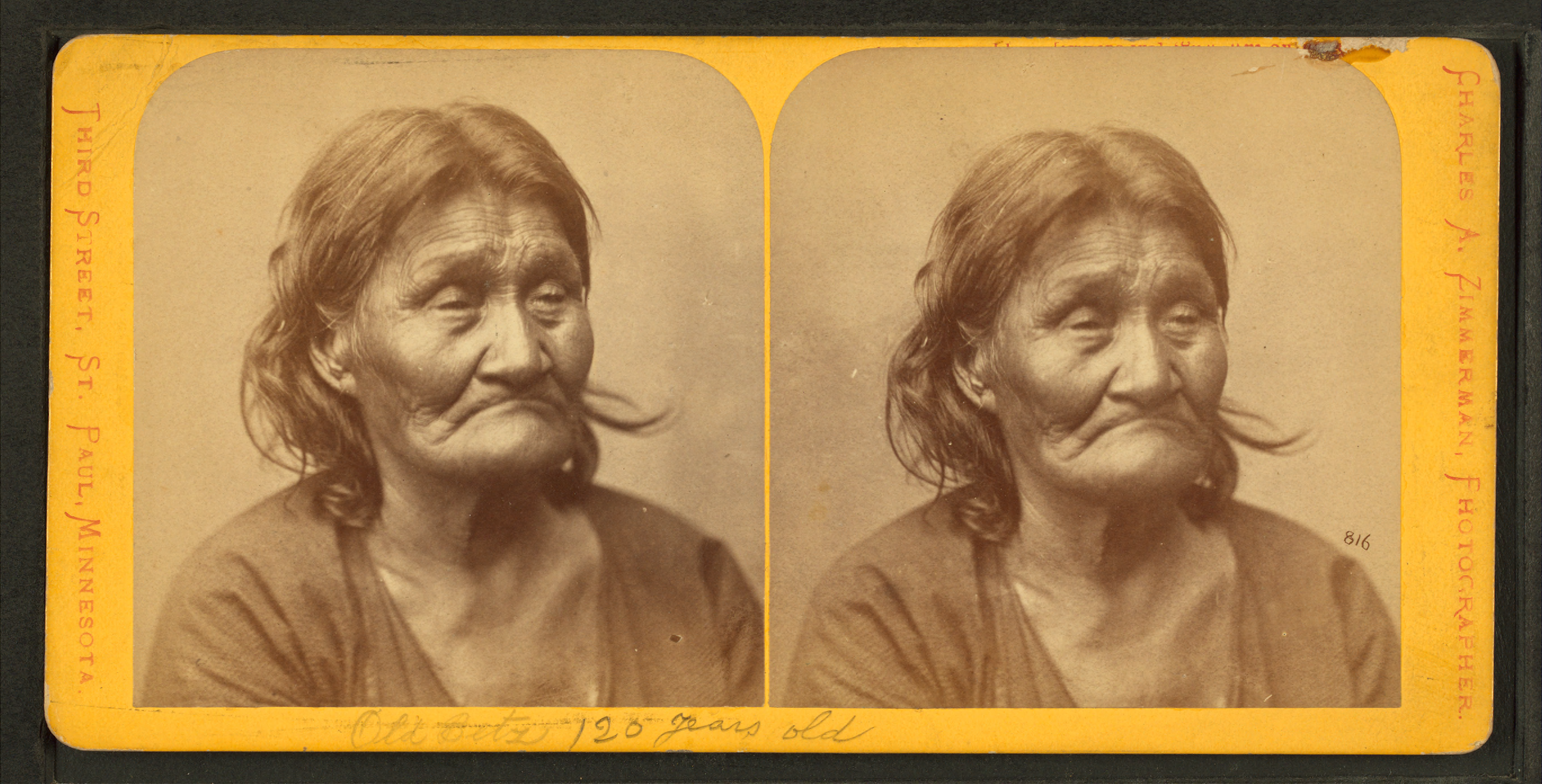
"Old Bets, 120 years old"
by Charles A. Zimmerman

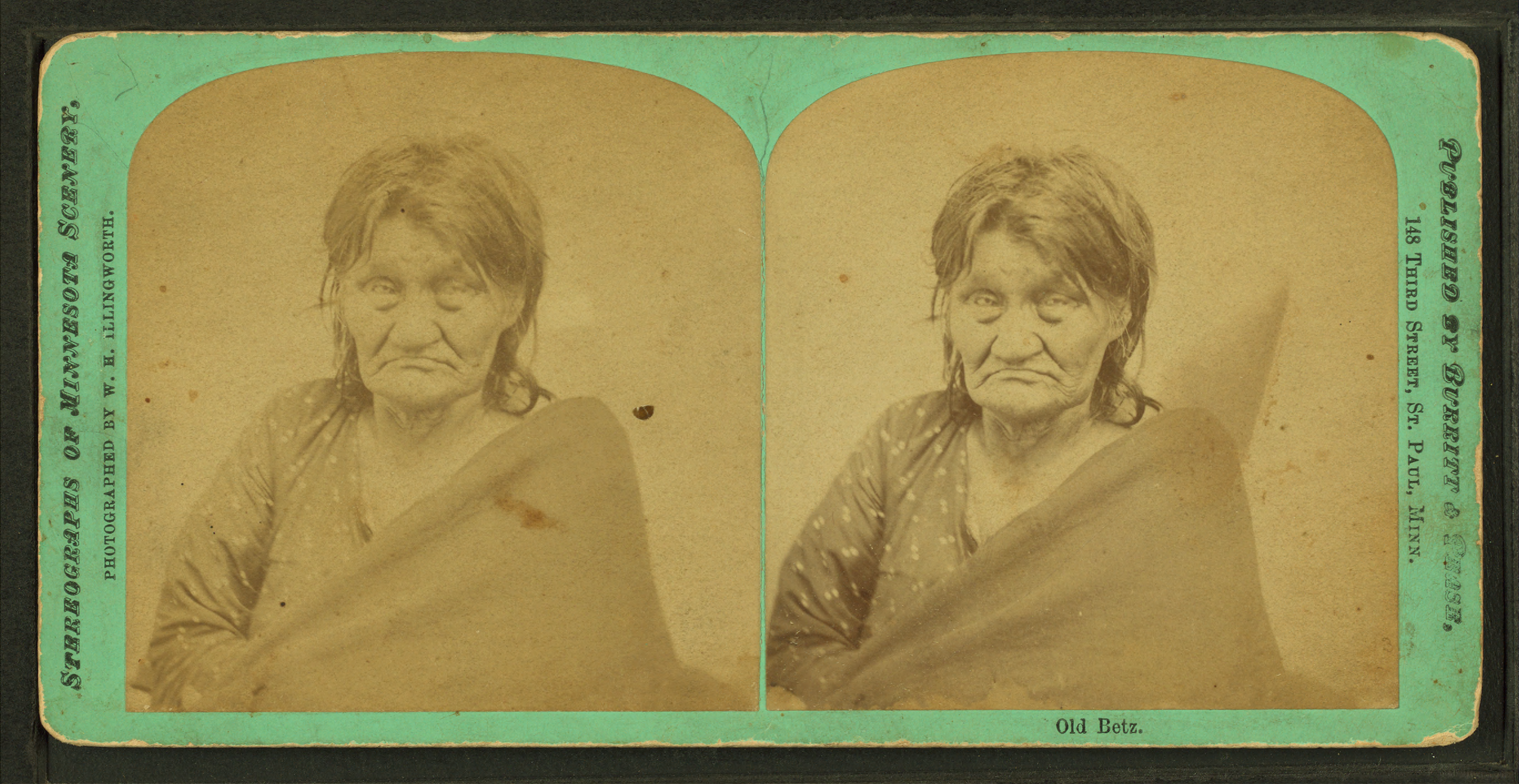
"Old Bets"
by William H. Illingworth

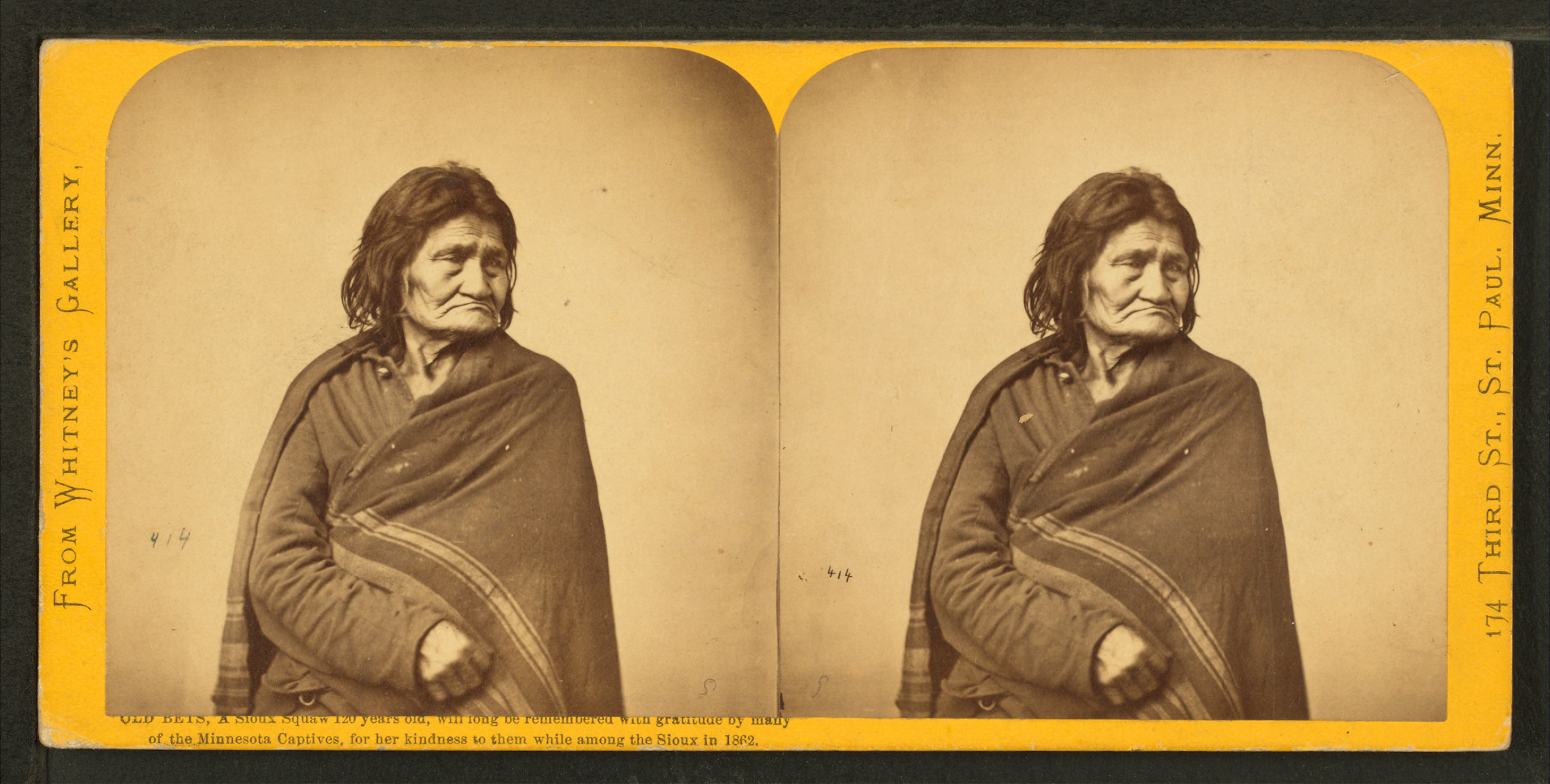
"Old Bets, a Sioux squaw"
by Joel E. Whitney
