= Nine Mile Creek Regional Trail =

Watershed Trail in Metro Minnesota

Coordinates: 44.879310°N 93.360159°W

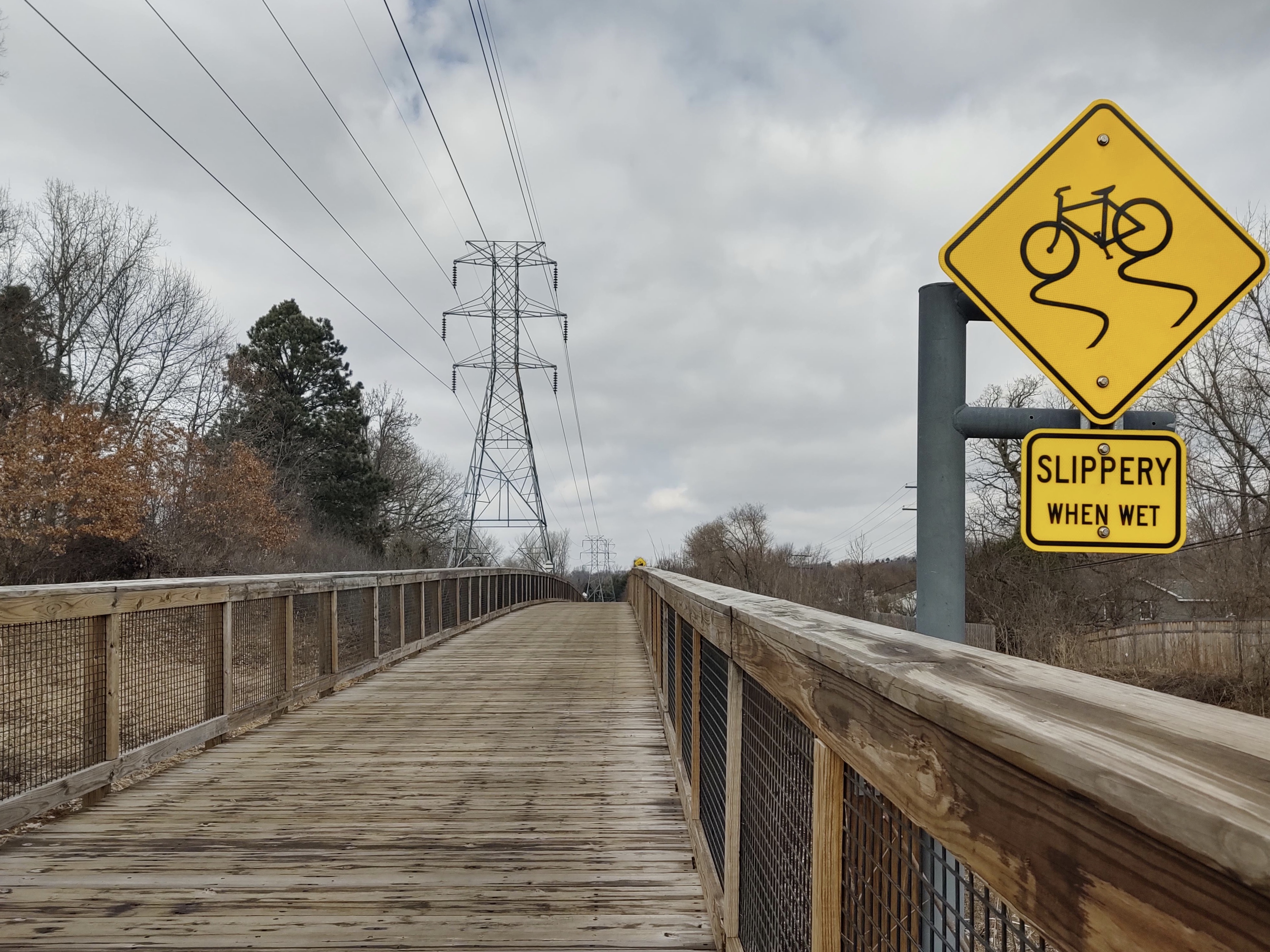
- An elevated boardwalk section of Nine Mile Creek Regional Trail in Edina.

Information
- Length: 15.30 miles (24.62 km)
- Location: Hopkins, Minnetonka, Edina, Richfield, and Bloomington
- Established: 2018
- Designation: Regional
- Use: Mixed use
- Difficulty: Easy
- Season: All
- Sights: Marsh, local parks
- Hazards: At-grade crossings, slippery surfaces
- Surface: Asphalt, wood

Nine Mile Creek Regional Trail is a 15.3-mile (24.6 km) mixed-use path in Hennepin County, Minnesota, United States. It is maintained by the Three Rivers Park District. The trail features 8 separate boardwalks in 1.7 miles (2.7 km) that traverse Nine Mile Creek and its marshes. It is predicted to serve 400,000 people yearly.

== Route ==
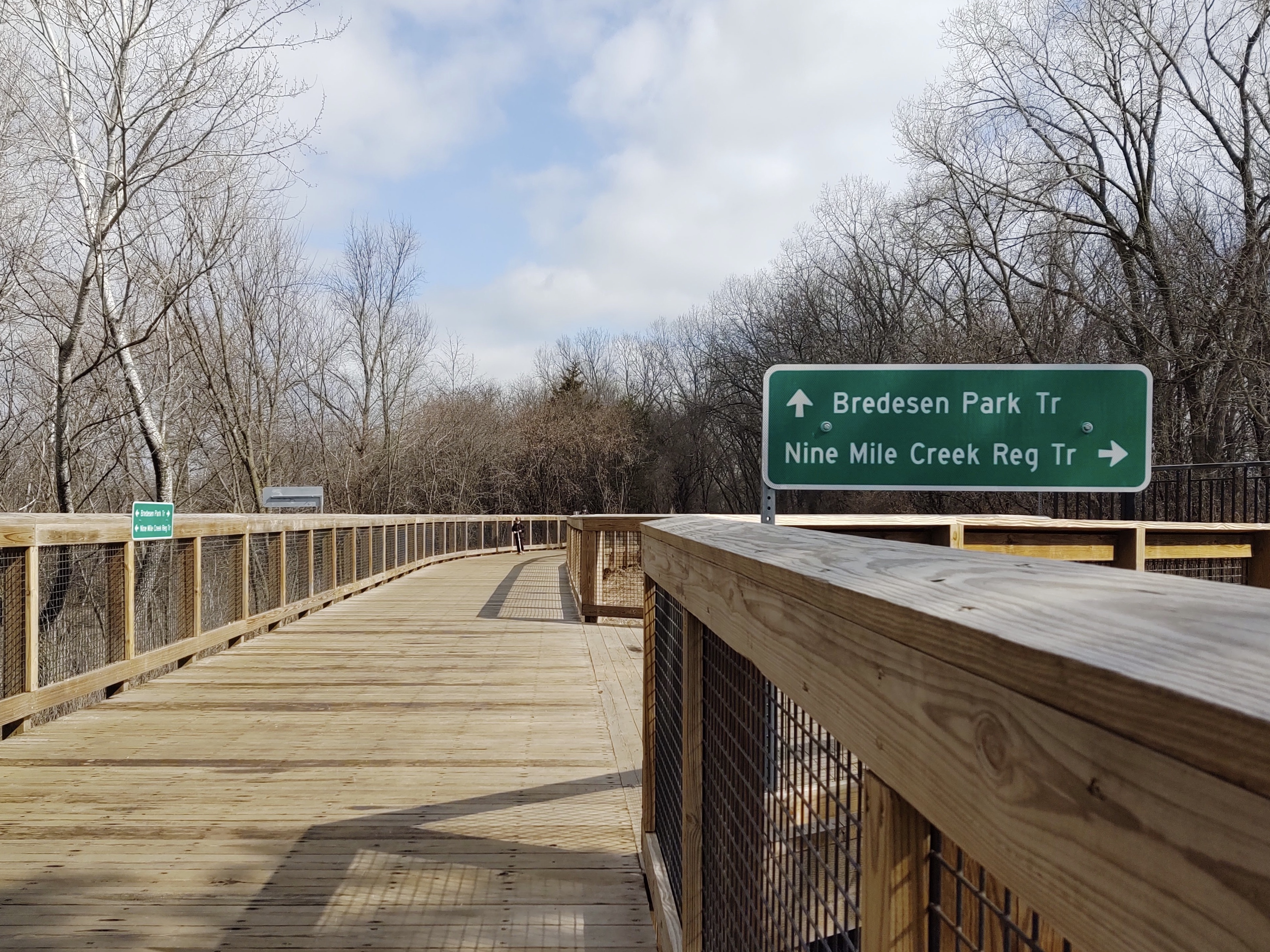
Bredesen Park, near MN 62

The trail begins in Hopkins at the Cedar Lake LRT Regional Trail and the Minnesota River Bluffs Regional Trail. It continues south through Hopkins and crosses the creek several times. It travels under US 169.

Then it resumes again in Edina and goes over several boardwalks. It passes through Walnut Ridge Park and soon after into Bredesen Park. It crosses MN 62 on a 588 feet (179 m) long bridge.

It crosses behind two local schools, including the Edina High School and passes over another boardwalk before making its way to a newly constructed roundabout at Tracy Avenue and turns south. On the longest boardwalk of the trail, it passes just east of Heights Park, and parallels the Xcel Energy powerlines and the Canadian Pacific Railway.

It passes under 70th Street and weaves through an office area. It then crosses a local road and MN 100 on a 1,025 feet (312 m) bridge. It parallels MN 100 and eventually goes east into the decommissioned Fred Richards Golf Course. It passes north of Centennial Lakes Park and into Adams Hill Park. It briefly turns south and then parallels 77th Street. It turns south eventually and turns east to cross I-35W at 76th Street. It continues east on this road before turning south onto 12th Avenue to cross I-494 on a separate bicycle and pedestrian bridge. At American Boulevard, it continues heading east through until it terminates at the Minnesota Valley National Wildlife Refuge Education and Visitor Center.

== History ==
The trail was mostly constructed from 2000-2014 In Richfield and Bloomington, with most of the trail being on-road. The original trail was 9.2 miles (14.8 km). In Edina, the trail was much harder to construct due to right-of-way issues and physical barriers such as roads and the creek itself. Construction required 19 easements and collaboration with Minnesota Department of Transportation and the city. The boardwalks were made in Oregon farms and there is over 1,100,000 square feet (100,000 m^{2}) of material.

Roads had to be narrowed to fit the trail without encroaching any private property, and a small stretch of the trail was sandwiched in between a freeway on-ramp and private property with less than 3 inches (7.6 cm) to spare. The entire trail was built over the 100-year floodplain, including boardwalks and bridges. Also, two bridges, over MN 100 and MN 62 were built at 588 feet (179 m) and 1,025 feet (312 m), respectively. The entire trail was finished and opened on June 3, 2018.

== See also ==
- Bicycle commuting
- Three Rivers Park District
- Southwest LRT Trail
- Nine Mile Creek (Minnesota River tributary)
