= Penasha =

18th-century Dakota tribal chief

Chief Penasha
- Wayaga Inazin
- Died: C. 1820-C.1833
- Successor: Takuni Phephe Sni
- Children: Takuni Phephe Sni
- Family: Good Road (grandson)

Chief Penasha (also known by Pinisha or and Wayaga Inazin) was an 18th and 19th-century Mdewakanton Dakota Chief.

In 1780, Penasha led a community of about 1900 people at the mouth of Nine Mile Creek, called Titanka Tannina, although it was also known as 'Pinisha's Village'. He was described by William Snelling as a "a harmless, worthless, drunken vagabond". Penasha was a common visitor to Fort Snelling.

He was a signer of the Land Cession Treaty in 1805.

In the 1820s or early 1830s, Penasha had died. He would be succeeded by Takuni Phephe Sni, and then shortly after by Penasha's grandson, Good Road. Titanka Tannina would also sometimes be labeled as 'Good Road' from then on, until it was dismantled in 1851, following the Treaty of Traverse des Sioux. The area is now part of Bloomington, Minnesota.
