= Good Road =

19th-century Dakota tribal chief

Chief Good Road
- Čhaŋkú Wašté
- Born: C.1784-1794; Titanka Tannina (now Bloomington)
- Died: 1852
- Years active: 1833-C.1851
- Predecessor: Takuni Phephe Sni
- Successor: Mankato
- Children: Mankato
- Father: Takuni Phephe Sni

Chief Good Road (Dakota: Čhaŋkú Wašté, sometimes spelled Tacanku Waste) was a Dakota Chief in Minnesota. He succeeded Takuni Phephe Sni as leader of his village, Titanka Tannina, in 1833. Chief Penasha was his grandfather.

As chief, Good Road focused largely on diplomacy. Gideon Pond described him as "...an intelligent man and often appeared well in conversation." However, Pond did not have a high opinion of Good Road. Good Road was a frequent visitor to the office of Alexander Ramsey while he was governor of the Minnesota Territory.

In 1839, a series of conflicts between the Dakota and the Ojibwe arose. Good Road attempted to convince Indian Agent Lawrence Taliaferro to send word to President Martin Van Buren of the war, in hopes that the United States Government would be able to intervene. Van Buren sent a letter in response encouraging the Dakota to seek revenge, but took no action in the conflict.

In 1844, he was arrested at Fort Snelling for insulting the captain in command of the fort. The soldiers tasked with arresting him intended to make an example out of him. However, they were unable to apprehend him until after a long chase, at which point all parties were too exhausted to continue with any criminal proceedings. He was released from custody soon after reaching the fort.

In 1851, he was a signer of the Treaty of Traverse des Sioux, and the Treaty of Mendota later that year. Titanka Tannina would be abandoned as a result of the treaties.

Good Road died in 1852. He was succeeded by his son, Mankato, who would fight in the US-Dakota War of 1862, and would be killed at the Battle of Wood Lake.
