= Normandale Lake =

Lake in the state of Minnesota, United States

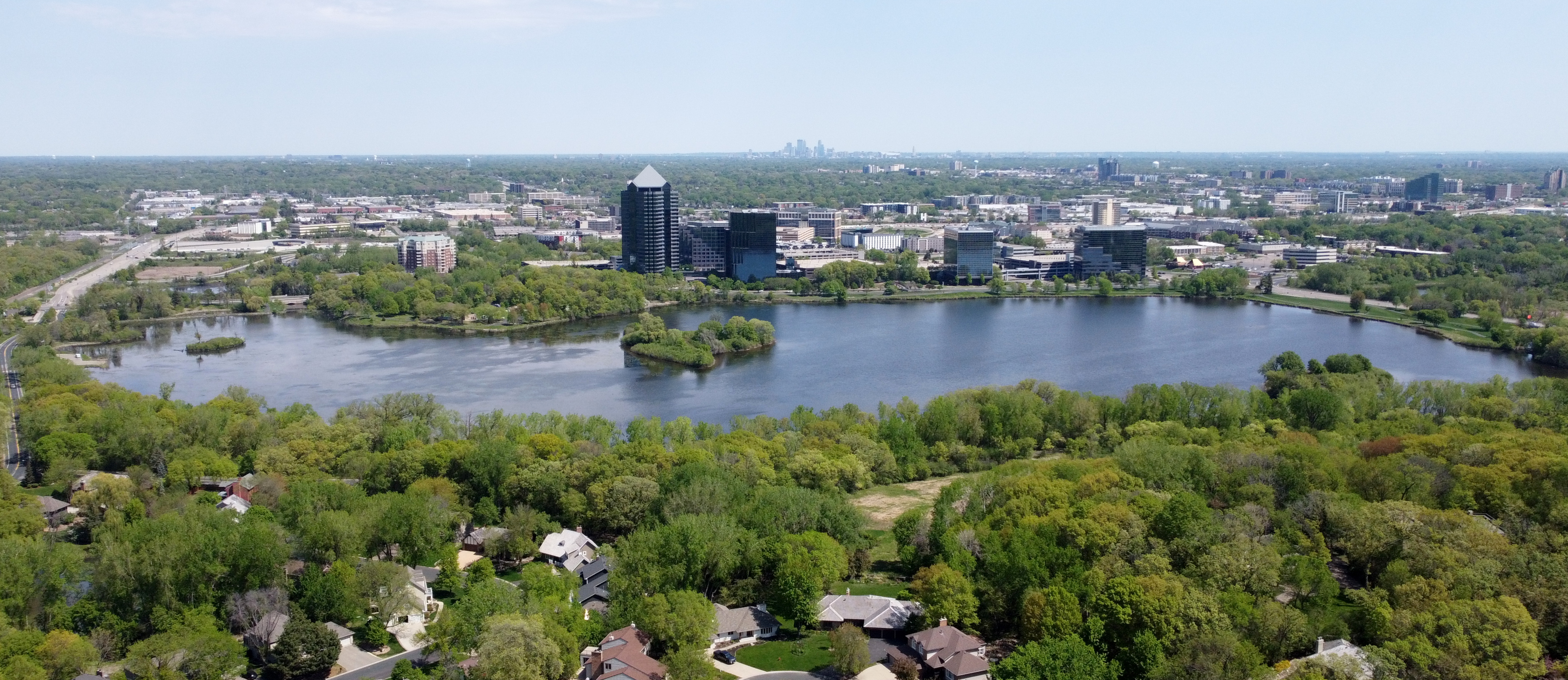
- Normandale Lake viewed from the south

- Location within Minnesota
- Location: Bloomington, Minnesota
- Coordinates: 44°50′59.99″N 93°21′32.66″W
- Type: Reservoir
- Primary inflows: Nine Mile Creek
- Primary outflows: Nine Mile Creek
- Catchment area: 14 square miles (36 km^{2})
- Basin countries: United States
- Surface area: 110 acres (45 ha)
- Surface elevation: 820 feet (250 m)

Normandale Lake is a man-made lake located in Bloomington, Minnesota, United States. Constructed in 1979 by damming a marsh floodplain along Nine Mile Creek, the lake serves as a stormwater retention basin, helping to control water levels downstream by storing stormwater and releasing excess water slowly.

== History ==
The creation of Normandale Lake was part of a flood control project initiated by the Nine Mile Creek Watershed District and the City of Bloomington. A control structure and dam along Normandale Avenue facilitated the transformation of the marshland into a lake.

In recent years, efforts have been made to improve the lake's ecological health. From August 2018 to March 2019, a lake drawdown was conducted, followed by alum treatment in May 2019 and herbicide treatment in May 2020. These measures aimed to reduce the presence of curly-leaf pondweed and to decrease phosphorus release from the lake bottom.

== Recreation ==
Normandale Lake is a popular destination for various recreational activities. The surrounding Normandale Lake Park offers several miles of paved and unpaved trails suitable for hiking, biking, and jogging. Visitors can enjoy scenic views of the lake and the surrounding landscape, as well as opportunities for birdwatching and wildlife observation.

The park also features amenities such as picnic areas, a bandshell for performances, and access to the larger Hyland-Bush-Anderson Lakes Park Reserve.

== Wildlife ==
The lake and its surrounding parklands provide habitat for a variety of wildlife species. Birdwatchers can observe species such as bald eagles, wood ducks, and trumpeter swans. The area is also home to mammals like deer, foxes, coyotes, muskrats, and turkeys.

== Management ==
As of January 1, 2025, Normandale Lake Park is under the management of the Three Rivers Park District, following a cooperative agreement with the City of Bloomington. This partnership aims to increase operational efficiency and reduce costs by having a single agency oversee all operations and maintenance within the park reserve.

== See also ==
- Three Rivers Park District
