= Shakopee II =

Mdewakanton Dakota chief

Chief Shakopee II
- Ṡaḳpedaƞ
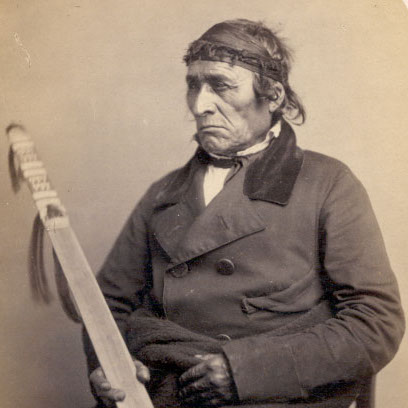
- Born: Ṡaḳpedaƞ c. 1794; Indiana Territory, U.S.
- Died: c. 1860; Morton; Minnesota Territory, U.S.
- Known for: Chief of the Mdewakanton Dakota
- Children: Shakopee III
- Father: Shakopee I

Shakopee II (d. 1860), also called Ṡaḳpedaƞ (lit. 'The Sixth'), was a Mdewakanton Dakota chief who was known as "The Orator of the Sioux." He was described by Reverend Samuel W. Pond of the First Presbyterian Church of Shakopee as "a man of marked ability in council and one of the ablest and most effective orators in the whole Dakota Nation." He was also called "Little Six" during his lifetime.

The city of Shakopee, Minnesota was named after Chief Shakopee II when it was first founded in 1851.

== Relationship with missionaries ==
In 1846, Chief Shakopee II invited missionary Gideon Pond to move to his village, Tintonwan, near present-day Shakopee, Minnesota. Shakopee asked Pond to open a school and mission on the recommendation of Oliver Faribault, the "mixed-blood" son of trader Jean-Baptiste Faribault.

Shakopee promised that children from his village would attend the school, and that Pond would be provided with pasture and fuel. Pond finally consented and built a house at what he called "Prairieville" in 1847, and lived there until he died in 1891. Pond went on to found the oldest church in Shakopee, the First Presbyterian Church, in 1855.

Although Pond held "Shakpay" in high regard for his oratorical skills, he also described as an enigmatic man who was "at the same time admired and despised by all who knew him."

As a speaker in council he had no equal among his contemporary chiefs. But while the advice he gave was generally good, the example set by him was often pernicious. He was of a nervous, excitable temperament... He was not remarkably malicious or revengeful and was easily reconciled to those who had offended him. At times he seemed magnanimous, and some of his speeches contained sage counsel and noble sentiments; but falsehood and truth were both alike to him, and he was often detected in the commission of petty thefts...

At the same time, Samuel Pond suggested that Chief Shakopee II could have prevented the initial attacks in the Dakota uprising of 1862, if he had been alive, a view that was also expressed separately by Chief Big Eagle. Pond explained:

Shakpay died before the massacre of the whites; if he had been living at the time, he might perhaps have prevented it, for his influence with his people was great and he always advocated the cultivation of peace and friendship with the white people. He sometimes alarmed the timid by the use of threatening language, but never seemed disposed to do serious injury to anyone. With all his faults, he was neither quarrelsome nor vindictive.

== Treaties ==
Shakopee was a signatory to the Treaty of Mendota of August 5, 1851, (as "Sha-k'pay"); he and other Dakota chiefs were pressured into selling 24 million acres (97,000 km^{2}) for pennies an acre.

In 1858, Chief Shakopee traveled to Washington, D.C. as one of the major chiefs in the Mdewakanton and Wahpekute treaty delegation.

Annuities of food and money were to be distributed from the federal government to the Indians as part of the treaty, but several years later after the outbreak of the American Civil War, United States broke their treaty obligations.

== Battle of Shakopee ==
The Battle of Shakopee took place in 1858, and was the last major conflict between the Dakota and Ojibwe. Dozens of warriors engaged in fighting, resulting in deaths on both sides, with no clear victor.

== Death and legacy ==
The death of "Old Shakopee" was announced on October 16, 1860 in the St. Paul Pioneer and Democrat.
