= Treaty of Mendota =

1851 treaty between the United States and Dakota

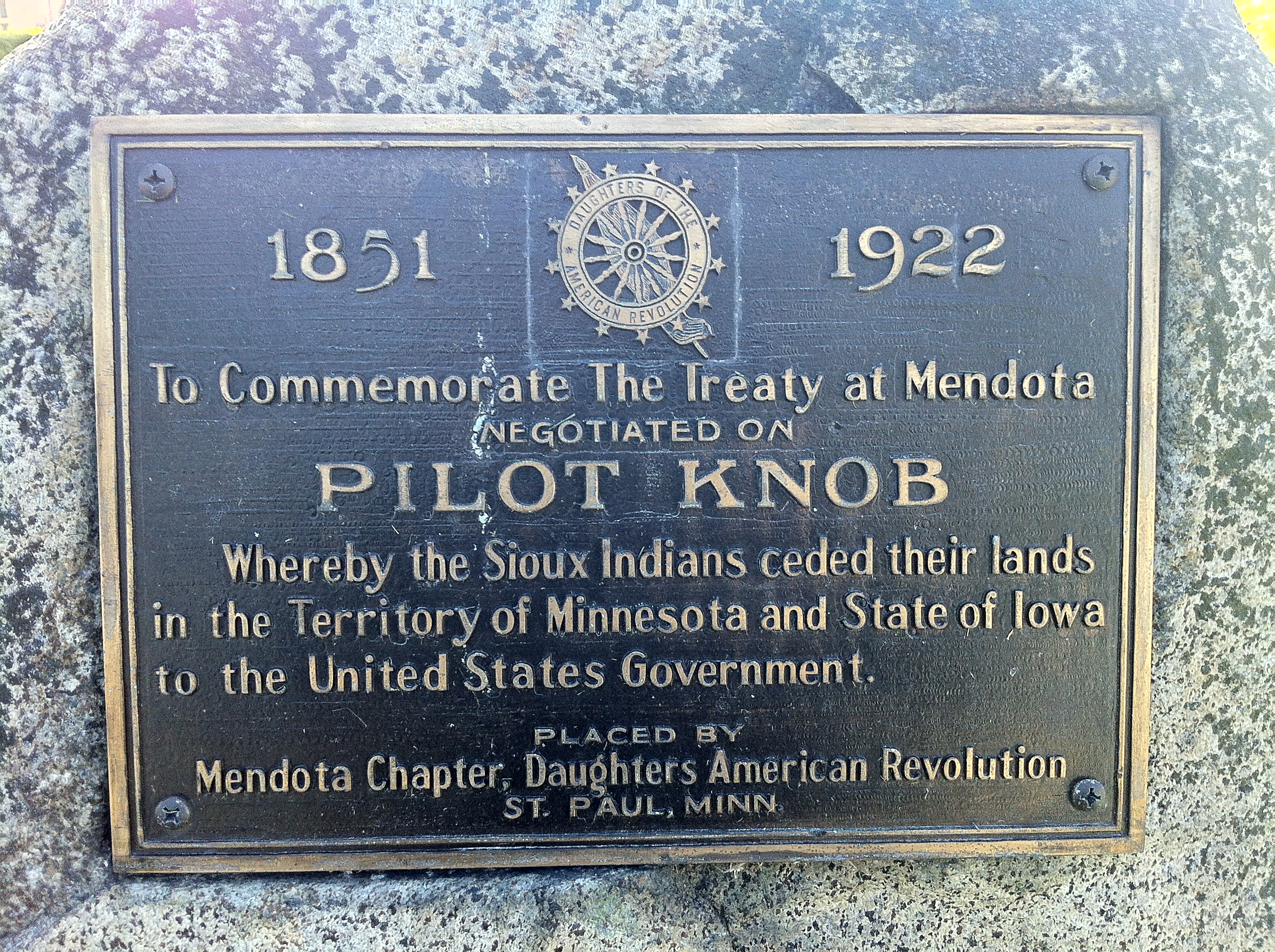
- DAR marker of the location where the treaty took place
- Type: Land cession treaty
- Context: Westward expansion into Minnesota Territory and Iowa
- Signed: July 29, 1851
- Location: Oheyawahi-Pilot Knob, Minnesota Territory, U.S.
- Effective: June 23, 1852
- Condition: Transfer of $1,410,000 in gold annuity payments and goods to natives; Natives to allow American settlement of purchased land; Natives resettled to the Upper Sioux Indian Reservation and Lower Sioux Indian Reservation along the Minnesota River
- Mediators: (United States) Alexander Faribault; (United States) Martin McLeod; (United States) Philander Prescott; (United States) Gideon Hollister Pond; (United States) Alexis Bailly; (United States) David Olmsted
- Signatories: (United States) Alexander Ramsey; (United States) Luke Lea; 64 Dakota leaders including; Good Road, Shakopee II, Thaóyate Dúta, and Wabasha III
- Parties: United States; Waȟpékhute Dakota; Mdewakanton Dakota
- Depositary: United States Department of State
- Language: English

The Treaty of Mendota (10 Stat. 954) was signed in Mendota, Minnesota, on August 5, 1851, between the United States federal government and the Mdewakanton and Wahpekute Dakota people of Minnesota.

The agreement was signed near Pilot Knob on the south bank of the Minnesota River and within sight of Fort Snelling. The treaty stipulated that the Mdewakanton and Wahpekute bands were to receive US$1,410,000 in return for relocating to the Lower Sioux Agency on the Minnesota River near present-day Morton, Minnesota along with giving up their rights to a significant portion of southern Minnesota.

With the signing of the Treaty of Mendota along with the earlier Treaty of Traverse des Sioux (10 Stat. 949), most of southern Minnesota became open to white settlement.

== Background ==
The first treaty with the Dakota was the Treaty with the Sioux, signed in 1805 at Pike Island, which ceded 100,000 acres at the confluence of the Mississippi and Minnesota rivers so that the U.S. government could build Fort Snelling. U.S. Army Lt. Zebulon Pike, the negotiator for the U.S., valued the land at $200,000. The U.S. Senate approved the treaty, which had no specific dollar amount written, and paid $2,000 for the land.

In 1837, following the collapse of the fur trade, the U.S. government negotiated new treaties with the Dakota and the Ojibwe. The Dakota received $16,000 in cash and goods up front, and promises of up to $40,000 per year in upcoming years. Fur traders received $90,000 in debt payments, and "relatives and friends" of the Dakota received $110,000.

In 1851, two further treaties were negotiated with the Dakota. The first was the Treaty of Traverse des Sioux, which was between the Sisseton and Wahpeton bands (or upper bands) of Dakota and the U.S. government. Commissioners Alexander Ramsey and Luke Lea justified the need for the two 1851 Treaties with the Dakota as necessary for "the overwhelming tide of migration", although newcomers' numbers on Dakota and Ojibwe land were still relatively small. Because of the desire to open the land to white settlement, and because, as former fur traders, they hoped to use the treaties to recoup debts that they claimed various bands owed to them, Ramsey and other white leaders like Henry Sibley convinced the U.S. government to negotiate the purchase of more Dakota and Ojibwe land.

After the treaty with the Sisseton and Wahpeton bands, the treaty delegation traveled to Mendota to meet with the two lower bands of the Dakota, the Mdewakaton and the Wahpekute. The Mdewakaton and Wahpekute were not as desperate as the upper bands for food and goods, but faced the threat of their lands being surrounded by white colonists. The negotiations referred back to the 1837 treaty, with Ta Oyate Duta and Wabasha III asking for the annuities from the 1837 be paid out before negotiations continued. The bands also wished for a different boundary on the proposed reservation. Negotiations stalled until it was agreed that $30,000 would be paid to the Dakota immediately in place of the 1837 annuity. Eventually, sixty five Dakota leaders signed the treaty. However, many leaders refused to sign traders' papers, which directed the government to first pay debts claimed by the traders using the money promised to the Dakota. Eventually, some Wahpekute leaders agreed to pay traders $90,000 and the Mdewakaton agreed to pay $70,000, with $20,000 to be shared among the seven chiefs. The Dakota were to receive $1,410,000 for their land, most of which would be held in trust.

The treaties with the Dakota, with a few changes, were approved by Congress on June 23, 1852. Forty-five leaders of the Wahpekute and Dakota signed the treaty on September 4, 1852.

The Dakota ceded much of their land and moved to reservations in western Minnesota. In total between both treaties, the Dakota received $3,750,000 for their land, estimated at about 12 center per acre, to be paid over several decades.

== Treaty ==
The text of the treaty is as follows:

ARTICLE 1.

The peace and friendship existing between the United States and the Med-ay-wa-kan-toan and Wah-pay-koo-tay bands of Dakota or Sioux Indians shall be perpetual.

ARTICLE 2.

The said Med-ay-wa-kan-toan and Wah-pay-koo-tay bands of Indians do hereby cede and relinquish all their lands and all their right, title and claim to any lands whatever, in the Territory of Minnesota, or in the State of Iowa.

ARTICLE 3.

[Stricken out.] (see end of section and note contribution to the Dakota War of 1862)

ARTICLE 4.

In further and full consideration of said cession and relinquishment, the United States agree to pay to said Indians the sum of one million four hundred and ten thousand dollars, ($1,410,000) at the several times, in the manner and for the purposes following, to wit:

- 1st. To the chiefs of the said bands, to enable them to settle their affairs and comply with their present just engagements; and in consideration of their removing themselves to the country set apart for them as above, (which they agree to do within one year after the ratification of this treaty, without further cost or expense to the United States,) and in consideration of their subsisting themselves the first year after their removal, (which they agree to do without further cost or expense on the part of the United States,) the sum of two hundred and twenty thousand dollars ($220,000.) Provided, That said sum shall be paid, one-half to the chiefs of the Med-ay-wa-kan-toan band, and one-half to the chief and headmen of the Wah-pay-koo-tay band, in such manner as they, hereafter, in open council, shall respectively request, and as soon after the removal of said Indians to the home set apart for them as the necessary appropriations therefor shall be made by Congress.
- 2nd. To be laid out, under the direction of the President, for the establishment of manual-labor schools; the erection of mills and blacksmith shops, opening farms, fencing and breaking land, and for such other beneficial objects as may be deemed most conducive to the prosperity and happiness of said Indians, thirty thousand dollars ($30,000.)

The balance of said sum of one million four hundred and ten thousand dollars, ($1,410,000) to wit: one million, one hundred and sixty thousand dollars ($1,160,000) to remain in trust with the United States, and five per cent. interest thereon to be paid annually to said Indians for the period of fifty years, commencing on the first day of July, eighteen hundred and fifty-two (1852,) which shall be in f ull payment of said balance, principal and interest: said payments to be made and applied, under the direction of the President as follows, to wit:

- 3rd. For a general agricultural improvement and civilization fund, the sum of twelve thousand dollars, ($12,000.)
- 4th. For educational purposes, the sum of six thousand dollars, ($6,000.)
- 5th. For the purchase of goods and provisions, the sum of ten thousand dollars, ($10,000.)
- 6th. For money annuity, the sum of thirty thousand dollars, ($30,000.)

ARTICLE 5.

The entire annuity, provided for in the first section of the second article of the treaty of September twenty-ninth, eighteen hundred and thirty-seven, (1837,) including an unexpended balance that may be in the Treasury on the first of July, eighteen hundred and fifty-two, (1852,) shall thereafter be paid in money.

ARTICLE 6.

The laws of the United States prohibiting the introduction and sale of spirituous liquors in the Indian country shall be in full force and effect throughout the territory hereby ceded and lying in Minnesota until otherwise directed by Congress or the President of the United States.

ARTICLE 7.

Rules and regulations to protect the rights of persons and property among the Indian parties to this Treaty, and adapted to their condition and wants, may be prescribed and enforced in such manner as the President or the Congress of the United States, from time to time, shall direct.

In witness whereof, the said Luke Lea and Alexander Ramsey, Commissioners on the part of the United States and the undersigned Chiefs and Headmen of the Med-ay-wa-kan-toan and Wah-pay-koo-tay bands of Dakota or Sioux Indians, have hereunto set their hands, at Mendota, in the Territory of Minnesota, this fifth day of August, Anno Domini, one thousand eight hundred and fifty-one.

L. Lea.

Alex. Ramsey.

Med-ay-wa-kan-toans.

Chief Ta-oya-te-duta, (his scarlet people, or "Little Crow")

Headmen Wa-kan-o-zhan, (Sacred Light, or Medicine Bottle)

Tee-tchay, (Top of the Lodge or "Jim." or "Old Thad")

Ta-tchan-h' pee-sa-pa, (His "Black Tomahawk.")

Ma-ka-na-ho-toan-ma-nee, (At whose tread the earth resounds)

H'-da-ee-yan-kay, (he runs rattling)

Too-kan-a-hena-ma-nee, (Walker on the Medicine Boulders or Stones)

Wa-m'dee-doo-ta, (Scarlet War Eagle)

Na-ghee-yoo-shkan, (He moves the Ghosts or Shadows)

Shoank'-a-ska, ("White Dog")

Hoo-sa-nee-ghee, (one leg yellow or orange colored)

Wa-keen-yan-wash-tay, ("Good Thunder")

Chief Wa-pa-sha, (The Standard, or "Red Leaf")

Headmen Wa-kan-hendee-o-ta, (Many Lightnings)

Tchan-h'pee-yoo-ka, (He has a war club)

Heen-han-doo-ta, (Red Owl)

Ma ka-ka-ee-day, (He sets the Earth on fire)

Ee-a-hee-herday, (He bursts out speaking)

Chief Wa-koo-tay, (The "Shooter")

Headmen Ma-h'pee-ya-ma za, (Metal cloud)

Ta-ma-za-ho-wash-tay, (his good iron voice)

Ma-ka ta-na-zheen, (He stands on the earth)

Ee-wan-kam-ee-na-zhan, (He stands above)

Wa-kan-ta-pay-ta, (The Spirit's Fire)

Na-ghee-mee-tcha-keetay, (He kills the Ghosts)

Een-yan-sha-sha, (Red Stones)

Ee-day-wa-kan, (Sacred Blaze)

Ta-sag-yay-ma-za, (His metal Staff)

Chief Ma-h'pee mee-tchash-tay, (man of the sky)

Headmen Wee-tchan-h'pee, (The Star)

Ta-tay-na-zhee-na, (Little standing Wind)

Headmen Hoak-shee-dan-doo-ta, (Scarlet Boy)

Am-pay-sho-ta, (Smoky Day)

Ha-ha-ka-ma-za, (Metal Elk)

Ta - tay - h'moo - he - ya - ya, ("Whistling Wind")

Wa-pa-ma-nee, (He strikes walking)

Ma-h'pee-ya-wa-kan, (Sacred Cloud)

Ta-tchan-h'pee-ma-za, (His Iron War Club)

Chief Ma-za-ho-ta, (Gray Metal)

Headmen Wa-soo-mee-tchash-ta-shnee, (Wicked or "Bad Hail")

Oan-ketay-hee-dan, (Little Water-God or "Little Whale")

Tcha-noon-pay-sa, (The Smoker)

Ta-tay-to-kay-tcha, (Other wind)

Ka-ho, (The Rambler about)

Chief Ta-tchan-koo-wash-tay, (Good Road)

Headmen Ta-tay-o-wo-teen-ma-nee, (Roaring Wind that walks)

O-yay-tchan-ma-nee, (Track Maker)

Ta-shoark-ay, (His Dog)

Chief Sha-k'pay, ("Six")

Headmen A-no-ghee-ma-zheen, (He that stands on both sides)

Hoo-ya-pa, (Eagle Head)

Ta-tay-mee-na, (Round Wind)

Ka-t'pan-t' pan-oo, (He comes pounding to pieces)

Ma-h'pee-ya-henda-keen-yan, (Walking across a cloud)

Wa-pee-ghee, (The orange red speckled cloud)

Ma-za-wa-menoo-ha, (Gourd shell metal medicine rattle)

Chief Hay-ee-tcha-h'moo-ma-nee, (Horn whistling walking)

Headmen Pay-pay, (Sharp)

Ta-wo-ta-way-doo-ta, (His Scarlet Armor)

Hay-pee, (Third Son)

A-pay-ho-ta, (Grey mane or crest)

Ho-tan-een, (His voice can be heard)

Ma-h'pee-ya-shee-tcha, (Bad Cloud)

Ta-wa-tcheen, (His mind)

Han-yay-too-ko-kee-pa-pee, (Night which is feared)

In presence of Thomas Foster, Secretary. Nathaniel McLean, Indian Agent. Alexander Fariboult, P. Prescott, G. H. Pond, Interpreters. David Olmstead; W. C. Henderson; Alexis Bailly; Richard Chute; A. Jackson; A. L. Larpenteur; W. H. Randall, Sr.; A. S. H. White; H. L. Dousman; Frederic B. Sibley; Marten McLeod; Geo. H. Faribault.

To the Indian names are subjoined marks.

SUPPLEMENTAL ARTICLE. 1st. The United States do hereby stipulate to pay the Sioux bands of Indians, parties to this treaty, at the rate of ten cents per acre, for the lands included in the reservation provided for in the third article of the treaty as originally agreed upon in the following words:

ARTICLE 3.

"In part consideration of the foregoing cession and relinquishment, the United States do hereby set apart for the future occupancy and home of the Dakota Indians, parties to this treaty, to be held by them as Indian lands are held, a tract of country of the average width of ten miles on either side of the Minnesota River, and bounded on the west by the Tchaytam-bay and Yellow Medicine Rivers, and on the east by the Little Rock River and a line running due south from its mouth to the Waraju River; the boundaries of said tract to be marked out by as straight lines as practicable, whenever and in such manner as the President of the United States shall direct: Provided, That said tract shall be held and occupied by said bands in common, and that they shall hereafter participate equally and alike, in all the benefits derived from any former treaty between said bands, or either of them, and the United States," which article has been stricken out of the treaty by the Senate. The said payment to be in lieu of said reservation; the amount, when ascertained under instructions from the Department of the Interior, to be added to the trust fund provided for in the fourth article. 2d. It is further stipulated that the President be authorized, with the assent of the said bands of Indians, parties to this treaty, and as soon after they shall have given their assent to the foregoing article, as may be convenient, to cause to be set apart by appropriate landmarks and boundaries, such tracts of country without the limits of the cession made by the first article of the treaty as may be satisfactory for their future occupancy and home: Provided, That the President may, by the consent of these Indians, vary the conditions aforesaid if deemed expedient.

== Contribution to the Dakota War of 1862 ==
The treaty, and disputes over its implementation, was a major contributor the Dakota War of 1862 between the U.S. and the Sioux. Following the stricken article 3 in both this treaty and Treaty of Traverse des Sioux, along with late payments the Dakota in due reasons ranging from corruption in the Bureau of Indian Affairs and costs of the U.S. Civil War, the Dakota felt cheated in their dealings with U.S. In 1862, annuities were delayed due to tardy Congressional appropriation, and due to a treasury debate over whether to pay the Dakota in paper currency or gold. The money usually arrived in late June, and did not arrive in St. Paul until August 16, 1862. Corruption also played a role. Bishop Whipple wrote to Washington D.C several times, and President Lincoln dispatched John Hay to investigate, concluding that agents working for Superintendent Major Cullen in particular, "have become rich".

Many Dakota were forced to shift from a nomadic culture into a fixed one, with Minnesota leaders advocating for the adoption of farming, especially due to the decline of the fur trade. Additionally, the reservation land that was seemingly guaranteed to be their own was further diminished by half in the 1858 Dakota Treaty. Many Dakota felt like their land was increasingly encroached upon by the American government and businesses, notably after Minnesota was admitted as a state of the Union in 1858.

The widespread sense that the Dakota has been cheated fueled anger and discontent and eventually helped trigger the Dakota War of 1862.

== See also ==
- Treaty of St. Peters
- Treaty of Traverse des Sioux

== General references ==
- Meyer, Roy Willard. History of the Santee Sioux: United States Indian Policy on Trial. Lincoln: University of Nebraska Press, 1993.
- http://digital.library.okstate.edu/kappler/vol2/treaties/sio0591.htm
