= Nine Mile Creek (Minnesota River tributary) =

Metro Minnesota Watershed

Coordinates: 44°48′02″N 93°17′25″W

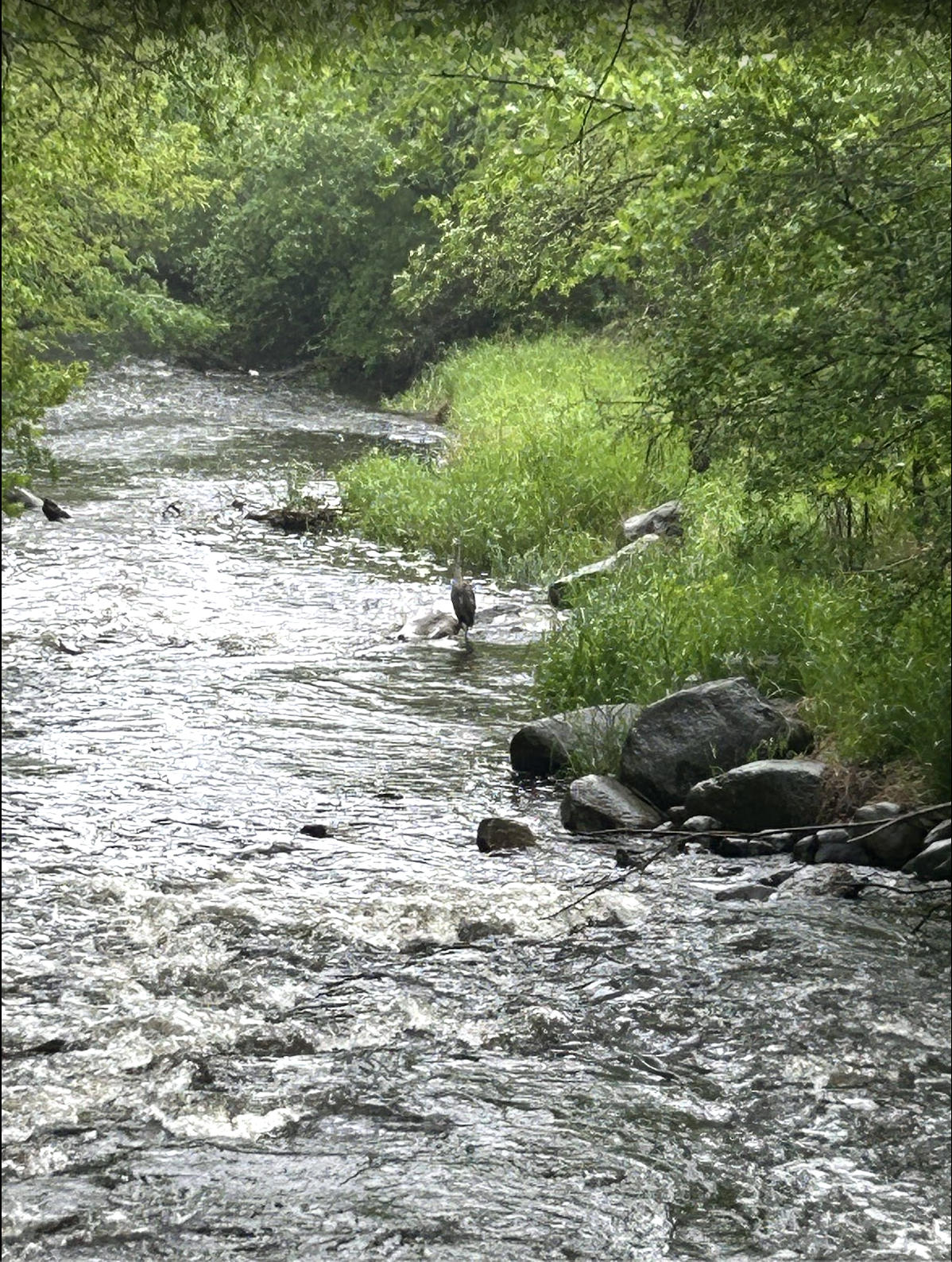
- Native name: Iyuṭapi Napciƞwaƞka (Dakota)

Physical characteristics
- Length: fifteen miles (24 km)
- Basin size: fifty miles (80 km)
- Discharge
  - location: Minnesota River

Basin features
- River system: Minnesota River
- Waterbodies: Normandale Lake

Nine Mile Creek, known in Dakota as Iyuṭapi Napciƞwaƞka, is a stream in Hennepin County, Minnesota, in the United States. It is a tributary of the Minnesota River.

Nine Mile Creek was named for its distance, nine miles (14 km) southwest of Fort Snelling where it crosses the (Old) Shakopee Road.

The stream has two branches, the main branch, with a length of fifteen miles (24 km), and the south branch, with a length of eight point five miles (13.7 km). The main branch begins in Hopkins and the south branch begins in Minnetonka. The two branches meet at Normandale Lake, in Bloomington.

== History ==
In 1780, the Dakota Chief Penasha led the village Ṭiṭaƞka Ṭaƞnina, located at the mouth of the stream home to about 1900 people. The Dakota name for the creek, Iyuṭapi Napciƞwaƞka, literally means 'Nine Measurements'. An older name for the creek is Ṭaḳokip̣a Ṡni Wóżupi Wakpadaƞ which can be translated as 'Stream Where the Dauntless Plants', a reference to Chief Tákuni P̣ep̣e Ṡni (possibly pronounced Ṭaḳokip̣a Ṡni), whose name means 'He Who Fears Nothing'. Tákuni P̣ep̣e Ṡni was chief of Ṭitaƞka Ṭaƞnina in the early 1830s.

Ṭiṭaƞka Ṭaƞnina would be abandoned in 1851, following the Treaty of Traverse des Sioux. In 1858, the area would be incorporated into Bloomington, Minnesota.

The area would be urbanized in the 1950s and 1960s. Between 2000 and 2014, the Nine Mile Creek Regional Trail was constructed. It was opened in 2018.

== See also ==
- List of rivers of Minnesota
- Nine Mile Creek Regional Trail
- Bassett Creek (Mississippi River tributary)
- Minnehaha Creek
