= Gideon H. Pond House =

Historic house in Minnesota, United States

- U.S. National Register of Historic Places
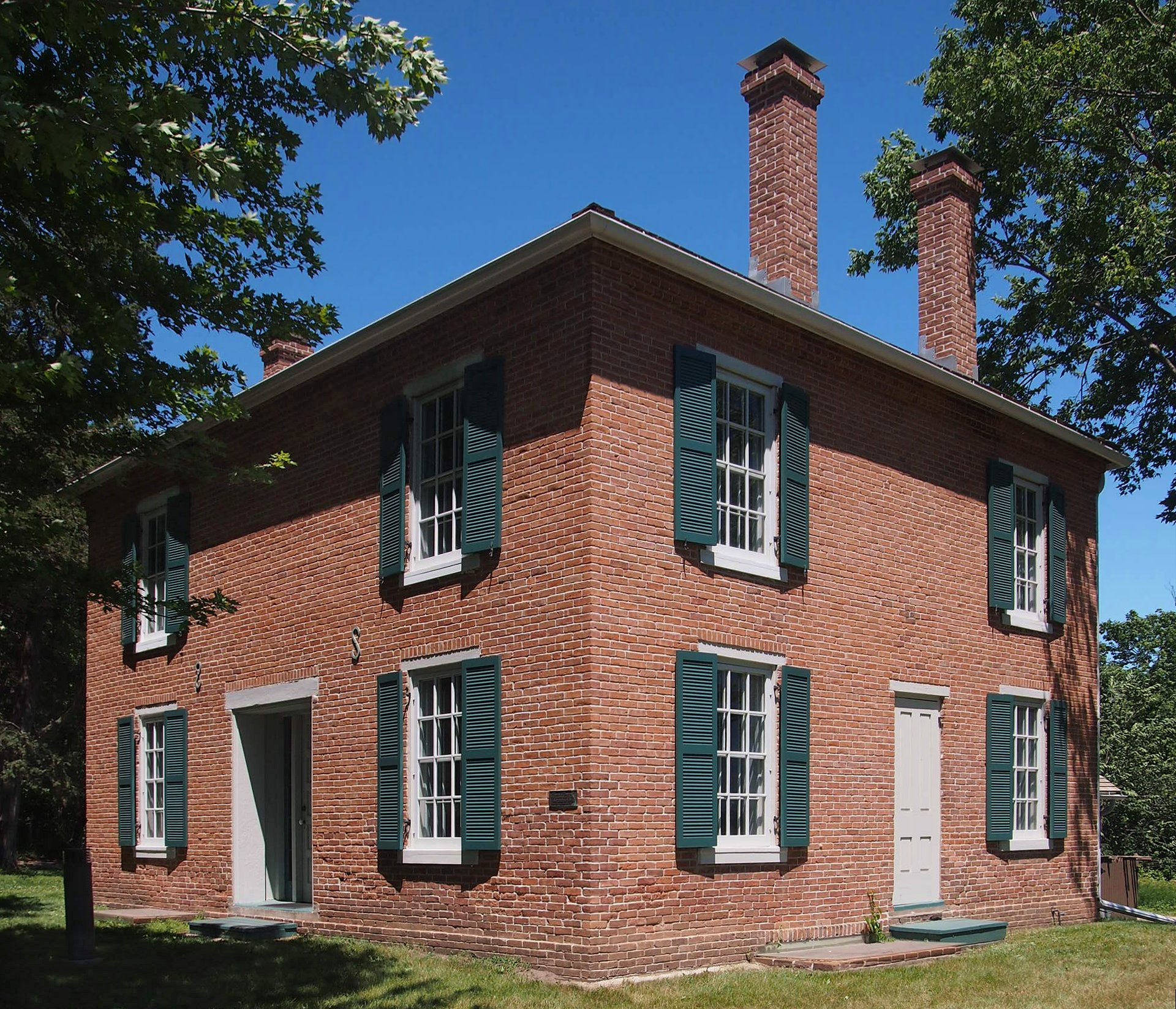
- The Gideon H. Pond House from the southwest

- Location within Minnesota Location within the United States
- Location: 401 104th Street East, Bloomington, Minnesota
- Coordinates: 44°48′48″N 93°16′16.8″W
- Area: 50 acres (20 ha)
- Built: 1856
- NRHP reference No.: 70000296
- Designated: July 16, 1970

The Gideon H. Pond House is a historic house in Bloomington, Minnesota, United States. It is part of the Pond-Dakota Mission Park, which also includes the Oak Grove Mission site (1843–1852), a cemetery, and the remains of the Pond family farm and orchards. The site is significant within the history of the Minnesota River valley, the Dakota tribe, and Bloomington. The house is listed on the National Register of Historic Places.

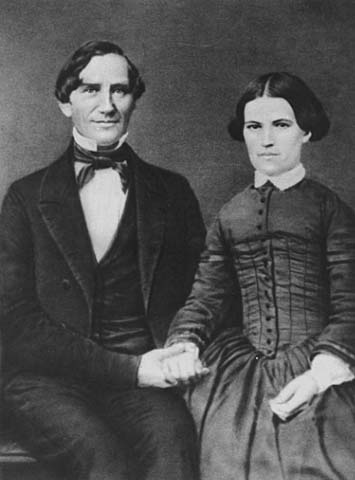
Gideon H. and Agnes C. Johnson Hopkins Pond, c. 1854

Gideon Hollister Pond (1810–1878) and his brother Samuel came to Minnesota with a mission to teach Christianity to the Indians and to teach them agriculture. The Ponds received permission in 1834 from Major Lawrence Taliaferro, the Indian agent at Fort Snelling, to establish a mission school near Bde Maka Ska (Lake Calhoun), where a band of Dakota spent their summers. Pond started work on writing a Dakota language dictionary. After a war broke out between the Dakota and the Ojibwa in 1839, the band of Dakota moved to a village near the Minnesota River, and Gideon Pond moved with them. He established a mission along the river bluffs. The area served as a mission between 1843 and 1852, when the Dakota were sent to a reservation further up the Minnesota River as a result of the Treaty of Traverse des Sioux. At that point, Pond bought this land and became a farmer. He also served as a member of Minnesota territorial House of Representatives 7th District, 1849–1850. Later, Pond started the Oak Grove Presbyterian Church, which was originally located on land which is now the Bloomington Cemetery. The church later moved its building to the corner of Penn Avenue and Old Shakopee Road.

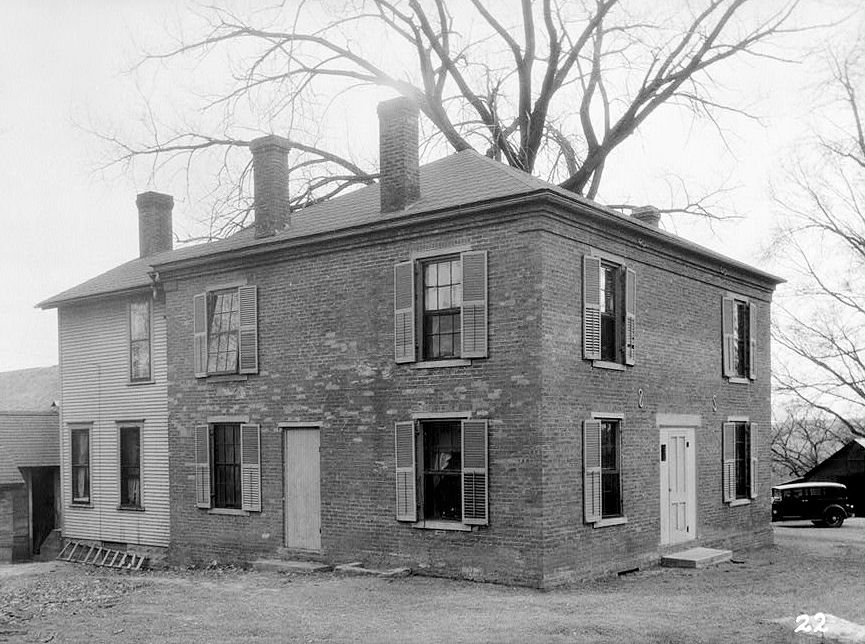
1934 view of the home

The home, located at 401 East 104th Street in Bloomington, is constructed of red brick and features chimneys serving each room. The home was occupied by Gideon and his wife Sarah, and is now open to the public on a limited basis.
