= Cloud Man =

Dakota Chief (c. 1780 – c. 1863)

- Maḣpiya Wic̣aṡṭa

Mdewakanton Dakota chief

Personal details
- Born: c. 1780 Near Mendota, Minnesota
- Died: c. 1863 Dakota concentration camp at Fort Snelling, Pike Island, Minnesota
- Spouse: Canpadutawin (Red Cherry Woman) (1810)
- Relations: Red Bird (brother in law); Paul Mazakutemani (brother)
- Children: Wakaninajinwin (Stands Sacred Woman) (daughter) Inażiŋwiŋ (The Day Sets) (daughter) Nancy Eastman (Wakantankawin, Great Spirit Woman) (granddaughter) Mary Eastman Faribault (Tipiwakanwin) (great-granddaughter) Lillian Evelyn Beane (Moore) (great-great-granddaughter)

Cloud Man (Dakota: Maḣpiya Wic̣aṡṭa; (Note: Cloud Man's name has also been translated as Man of the Sky and transliterated as Marpiya Wicasta and Marpiya-wichashta.) c. 1780 – c. 1863) was a Dakota chief. The child of French and Mdewakanton parents, he founded the agricultural community Ḣeyate Otuŋwe on the shores of Bde Maka Ska in 1829 after being trapped in a snowstorm for three days. The village was seen by white settlers as a progressive step towards assimilation, yet members of the community maintained a distinctly Dakota way of life. The community was abandoned in 1839 and Cloud Man's band moved along the Minnesota River to join the Hazelwood Republic.

Cloud Man died during internment at the concentration camp at Fort Snelling on Pike Island, which held nearly 1,700 eastern Dakota and Ho-Chunk non-combatants, mainly women and children, after the U.S.–Dakota War of 1862.

== Life ==
Cloud Man was born a member of the Mdewakanton Dakota around 1780 in a village eight miles (13 km) from Mendota, Minnesota, on the southern side of the Minnesota River. His father was French and his mother was Mdewakanton, reportedly the granddaughter of a Mdewakanton chief who met Louis Hennepin during his mission to explore New France in the late 1670s and early 1680s. Indian agent Lawrence Taliaferro at one point tried to convince him to begin a non-nomadic lifestyle at Bde Maka Ska. (Note: Bde Maka Ska was later known as Lake Calhoun.)

During a hunting trip on the plains near the Missouri River, Cloud Man and his party were trapped by a snowstorm and were forced to wrap themselves in blankets and lie on the ground, waiting for the snow to pass. Members of the party were cut off from one another, buried separately beneath snowdrifts with some small quantities of dried buffalo meat on which to subsist. Cloud Man recounted to missionary Samuel W. Pond that he would periodically dig to the surface of the snow to try and find his fellow hunters, only to be greeted with more gales of snow. When the storm subsided after almost three days, he emerged from the snow and called for the other members of his party, finding both that every one had survived the storm and that they were not far from an Indian camp.

Cloud Man spent some of his time during the storm reflecting on Taliaferro's proposal and after returning home to Black Dog village, visited him at Fort Snelling for advice on establishing an agricultural community. Military officials at the fort responded favorably to Cloud Man's plan and provided assistance in the form of tools and seeds. He returned to Black Dog village and convinced several families to move to the banks of Bde Maka Ska with him.

=== Ḣeyate Otuŋwe ===
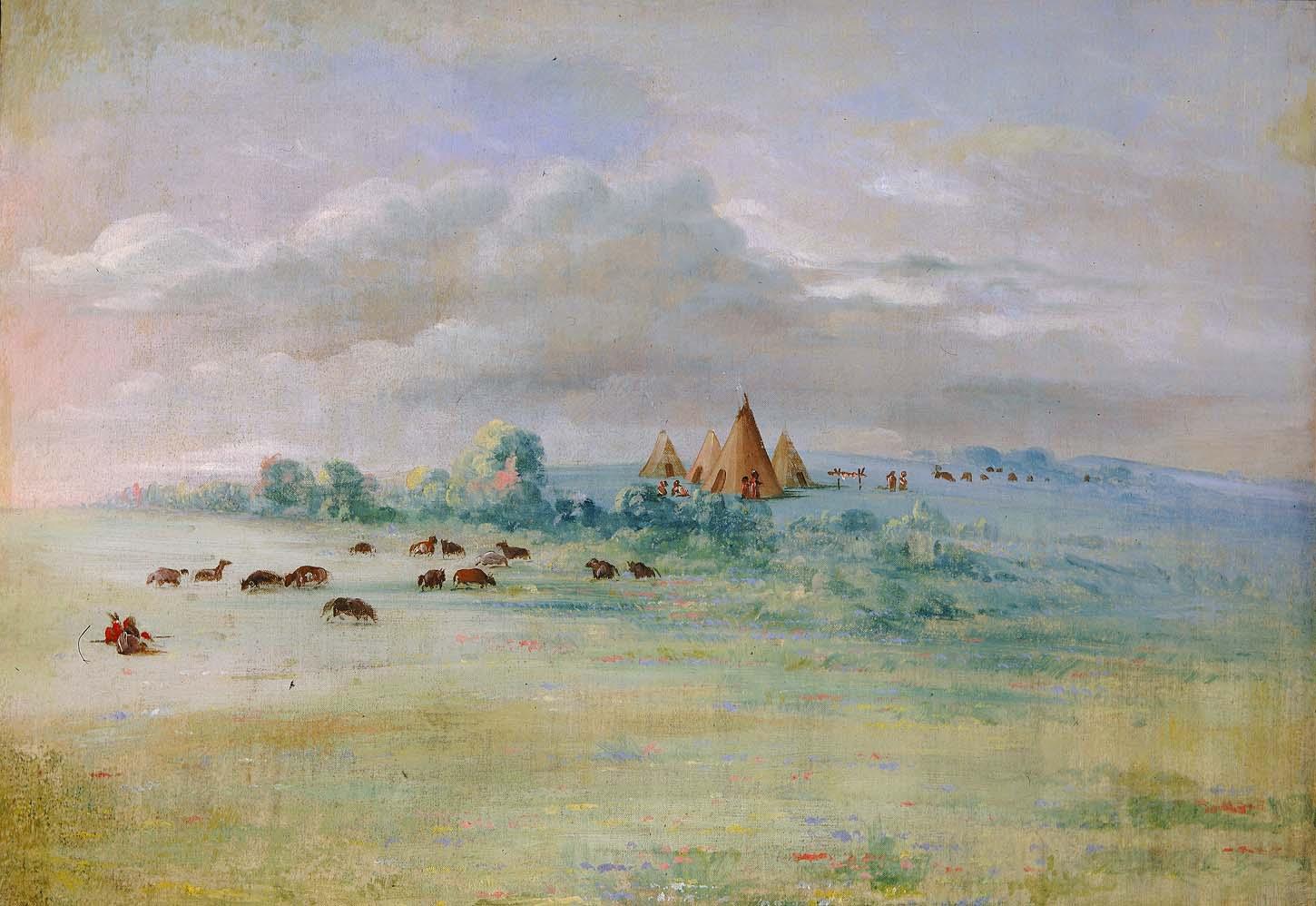
Ḣeyate Otuŋwe, painted by George Catlin between 1835 and 1836

The agricultural colony Ḣeyate Otuŋwe (Note: Ḣeyate Otuŋwe was also referred to as Cloudman's Village or Eatonville by Taliaferro.) was established in August 1829 on the shores of Bde Maka Ska on the present-day site of Lakewood Cemetery in Minneapolis. He was elected chief of the community at approximately thirty-five years old and members of the Ḣeyate Otuŋwe community began to grow corn and potatoes.

Taliaferro and other white settlers in the area, such as Pond and his fellow missionary brother Gideon who came to live in the village, viewed Ḣeyate Otuŋwe as an experiment in "civilized life" for the Dakota, with Taliaferro referring to the community as "my little Colony of Sioux agriculturalists." Katherine Beane argues that what Taliferro viewed as a "progressive" move towards assimilation into European customs represented a step towards independence for a Cloud Man's band at a time when traditional Dakota practices faced existential challenges from white settlers encroaching into historically Dakota spaces. Beane suggests that in establishing Ḣeyate Otuŋwe, Cloud Man never "intend[ed] to forsake his identity as a Dakota man" and that "The change in subsistence patterns did not make the people of this village any less Dakota." Members of Ḣeyate Otuŋwe shared some of the corn they grew with members of other Dakota villages, prompting Taliaferro to give a speech to the village in September 1835, instructing them to cease the practice as counter to their self-interests; they did not. Cloud Man also traveled to Washington, D.C., in 1837 as part of a Dakota delegation and spoke to leaders of the Sauk and Meskwaki tribes regarding recent fighting between the two groups.

As of 1839, the community had a population of 207 people: 54 women, 72 men, and 81 children. Ḣeyate Otuŋwe was abandoned that year as Cloud Man feared retaliation from nearby members of the Ojibwe, following the fighting of the Dakota-Ojibwe War reaching nearby. Cloud Man and his band moved to the shores of the Minnesota River, close to Bloomington, Minnesota. In 1851, Cloud Man moved with his band up the Minnesota River to near Yellow Medicine County where they joined a community of agricultural Indians, which would become the Hazelwood Republic. His brother, Paul Mazakutemani, would serve as president of the Republic. During the U.S.–Dakota War of 1862, he was interned at the Pike Island concentration camp where he died during the winter of 1862–1863. The spot of his death and burial was near the place of his birth.

In 2019, the Bde Maka Ska Public Art Project, commemorating the history of Ḣeyate Otuŋwe, was completed.

== Family ==
According to Thomas Hughes, a Welsh Mankato-area pioneer historian who wrote the genealogy Indian Chiefs of Southern Minnesota (1927), Cloud Man had seven children, five sons and two daughters, including David Weston, who took on the chieftainship after Cloud Man's death. Charles Eastman, a descendant of Cloud Man, wrote in 1927 that Cloud Man had five children, three daughters and two sons. Hughes reported that only Weston was still living as of 1906. Cloud Man was also the brother-in-law of Red Bird.

Two daughters were Wakaninajinwin (Stands Sacred Woman, "Stands Like a Spirit" with the Christian name "Lucy" in Hughes's genealogy) and Inażiŋwiŋ (The Day Sets, "Hushes the Night" in Hughes's genealogy). Nancy Eastman (Wakantankawin, Great Spirit Woman) was granddaughter through her mother Wakaninajinwin. Nancy had Mary Eastman Faribault (Tipiwakanwin), great granddaughter of Cloud Man, and Mary went on to have Lillian Evelyn Beane (Moore), Cloud Man's great-great-granddaughter.

Two sons were Ecetukiya (He Who Brings What He Wants) and Solomon Two Stars.

=== Notable modern descendants ===
Modern descendants who claim Cloud Man as an ancestor include:

- Katherine Beane (Flandreau Santee Sioux), a Dakota history author.
- Syd Beane (Flandreau Santee Sioux), through Cloud Man's daughter Wakaŋ Inażiŋ Wiŋ (Stands Sacred Woman), is an author, researcher, educator, and filmmaker.
