= Paul Mazakutemani =

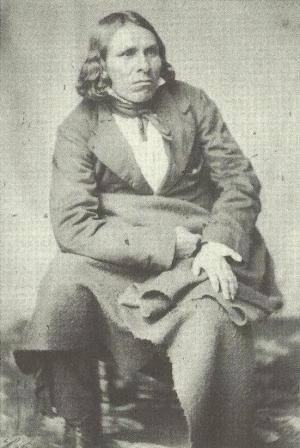
- Mazakutemani in 1858

President of the Hazelwood Republic
- In office 1856–1860
- Preceded by
- Succeeded by: Simon Anawangmani

Personal details
- Born: 1806 Lac qui Parle
- Died: 1887 (aged 80–81) Roberts County, South Dakota
- Children: Joshua Mazakute
- Parent: Old Eve (father)

Paul Mazakutemani, (Note: also spelled 'Mazakootaymani' in older texts) also known as Little Paul, (1806 – 1887) was a Dakota politician and orator. He served as president of the Hazelwood Republic from 1856 to 1860.

== Biography ==
Mazakutemani was born at Lac qui Parle in 1806. He was a cousin of Little Crow, and younger brother of Cloud Man. Early in his life, he converted to christianity. He was educated by Thomas Smith Williamson, and became literate.

=== Hazelwood Republic ===
In 1856, Mazakutemani was a signer of the Hazelwood Republic's constitution. He was then elected as the first president of the Hazelwood Republic, and served for two terms until leaving office in 1860.

The Hazelwood Republic remained neutral in the US-Dakota War of 1862. Former president Mazakutemani attempted to convince an early war party to lay down their arms, saying;

The Americans are a great people. They have much lead, powder, guns, and provisions. Stop fighting, and now gather up all the captives and give them to me. No one who fights with the white people ever becomes rich, or remains two days in one place, but is always fleeing and starving.

— Paul Mazakutemani

The Republic would be destroyed following the Dakota's defeat.

=== Later life ===
Mazakutemani would move to the Dakota Territory later in life, living on the land that would become the Lake Traverse Indian Reservation.
