= Gideon Hollister Pond =

American politician (1810–1878)

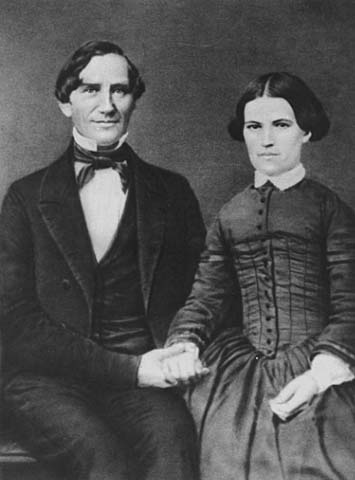
Gideon Hollister Pond and his wife Agnes, c. 1854

Gideon Hollister Pond (June 30, 1810 – January 20, 1878) was an American Presbyterian missionary, clergyman, and territorial legislator.

== Early life and education ==
A son of Elnathan Judson Pond and Sarah Hollister Pond, Gideon and his brother Samuel (April 10, 1808 – December 12, 1891) grew up in Washington, Connecticut. Gideon received religious instruction "at his mother's knee," but did not take religion seriously until he and his brother experienced a revival in August 1831.

== Career as missionary ==
Looking for an evangelistic opportunity, the Pond brothers determined that the Dakota people, living in what is now southern Minnesota, would make an appropriate mission. They arrived at St. Peters (now St. Paul, Minnesota), on May 1, 1834, with no formal training or credentials and no financial sponsorship other than their personal savings. Marpiya Wicasta (Cloud Man), chief of a village living at Bde Maka Ska (Lake Calhoun) in present-day Minneapolis, had requested assistance with farming, and Gideon took this role, intending to learn the Dakota language.

The brothers believed that the ability to speak the language accurately was essential if their message was to be received. As they learned, they devised an alphabet suitable for recording the sounds of Dakota, and they taught this to their neighbors, thus bringing them the ability to read and write in their own language. They also began to compile a Dakota dictionary, to which later missionaries also contributed. The Pond alphabet and the Dakota–English dictionary are still in use. The Ponds also taught the Dakotas subsistence agriculture.

In 1835 other missionaries arrived to work with the Dakota, notably Revs. Dr. Thomas S. Williamson and J. D. Stevens. Gideon worked for Stevens for a time, then, at the urging of Dr. Williamson, moved to the newly established station at Lac qui Parle, where Joseph Renville had a major trading center. Gideon spent three years (1836–39) at the Lac qui Parle Mission.

In 1837 Gideon married Sarah Poage, a sister of Thomas Williamson's wife Margaret.

As a result of warfare between the Ojibwe and Dakota people in 1839, Cloud Man's village relocated to a bluff near the Minnesota River in present-day Bloomington. This site became known as Oak Grove, and a mission was established there in 1843. The site became Gideon's home, currently part of the Pond-Dakota Mission Park.

In 1850-51 Gideon edited a bilingual newspaper known as The Dakota Friend (Dakota Tawaxitku Kin).

== Career as clergyman and legislator ==
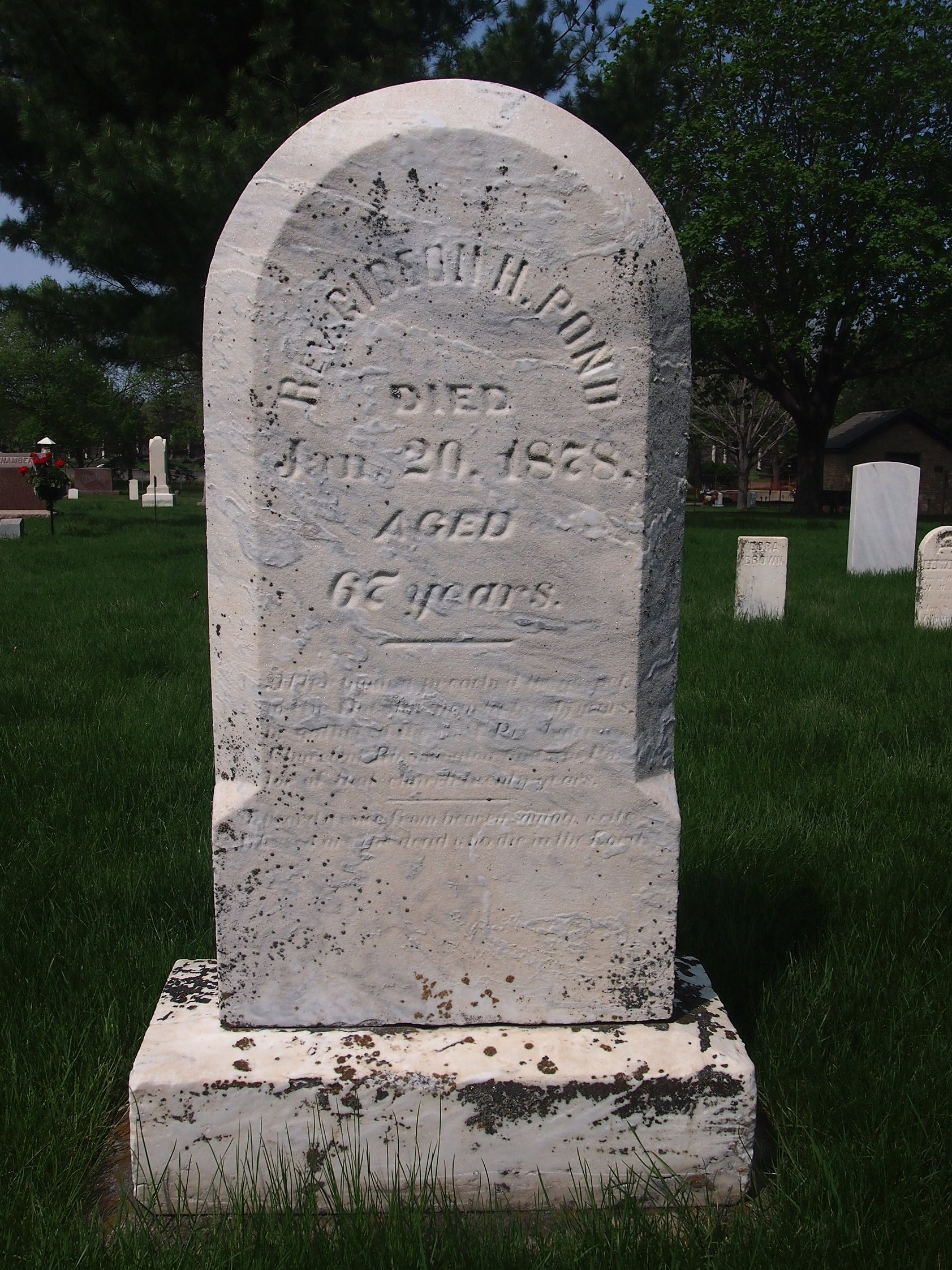
Gideon Pond's gravestone

Seeing the need to obtain credentials as an ordained minister in order to be accepted by his missionary colleagues, Gideon returned to Connecticut for a time to begin the necessary studies. He was licensed to preach in 1847 and ordained in 1848 as a Presbyterian minister.

When Minnesota Territory was established in 1849, Gideon served in the first Minnesota Territorial Legislature in the Minnesota Territorial House of Representatives. He was noted for his efforts to promote civil rights and to protect the integrity of the Sabbath.

Most members of the Dakota tribe were moved to reservations after the Treaty of Traverse des Sioux in 1851. The Pond brothers determined to leave the Dakota mission and serve the incoming settlers as pastors. Gideon was the first pastor of the First Presbyterian Church of Oak Grove (founded in 1855), currently Oak Grove Presbyterian Church. He served in that role until his retirement in 1873. As the pastorate's salary was modest and was not always paid, Gideon also operated a farm.

After his first wife died, Gideon married in 1854 another former missionary colleague, Agnes C. Johnson Hopkins, widow of Robert Hopkins. The two marriages produced 13 children, in addition to the three surviving children from Agnes' first marriage.

In the wake of the Dakota War of 1862, many Dakota men were imprisoned at Mankato, among them Wak-anhdi Ota, father of Ohiyesa. A religious revival took place among the prisoners, and about 300 of the men requested Christian baptism. About 50 men of the former Lake Calhoun village asked Gideon to perform the baptismal ceremonies, and his diary describes this moving experience. Several Dakota families, numbering about 50 people, were members of the Oak Grove congregation subsequent to the war.

Gideon died of pneumonia and was buried in the First Presbyterian Church of Oak Grove Cemetery. A Presbyterian retirement home and two elementary schools (one in Bloomington and one in Burnsville), among other institutions, are named for him.
