= Simon Anawangmani =

Elder Reverend Judge Simon Anawangmani
- Anahwangmanne
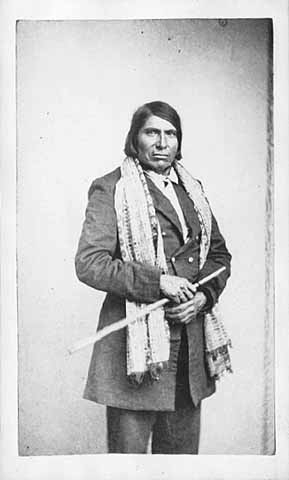
- Anawangmani in 1862

2nd President of the Hazelwood Republic
- In office 1860 – November 7, 1862
- Preceded by: Paul Mazakutemani
- Succeeded by: (position abolished)

Personal details
- Born: ~1808
- Died: June 28, 1891 Sisseton Reservation
- Party: Dakota Peace Coalition (1862)

Religious life
- Religion: Presbyterian
- Ordination: 1866

Simon Anawangmani (~1808 (Note: Some sources give 1813) – June 28, 1891) was a Dakota politician, judge, and Presbyterian Pastor who served as second president of the Hazelwood Republic from 1860 until the Republic's destruction in 1862.

== Early life ==
Anawangmani was born in about 1808. He became educated, and converted to christianity in 1841. It was at his baptism that he took the name 'Simon'. He was taught by Stephen R. Riggs.

== Career ==
Anawangmani was one of the signers of the constitution of the Hazelwood Republic on July 29, 1856. Anawangmani became prominent in the Republic due to his involvement in the Hazelwood church. He became an Elder in the church.

Anawangmani became one of three judges in the Republic.

In 1860, Anawangmani became president of the Hazelwood Republic. During his presidency, the U.S.-Dakota War of 1862 began. The Hazelwood Republic, with friendly relations with the United States, remained neutral. Anawangmani joined the Dakota Peace Coalition, a political party founded by his predecessor, Paul Mazakutemani, composed of anti-war Dakota. Following the Dakota's defeat in the war, the United States destroyed the Hazelwood Republic, with Anawangmani being marched to the concentration camp at Fort Snelling, where he was held until 1863. Anawangmani then got his freedom by joining Henry Hastings Sibley's Expedition to hunt down and kill escaped Dakota warriors as a scout. In 1865, he was discharged.

== Later life ==
In 1866, he was ordained a Presbyterian pastor, and in 1867 moved to the Sisseton Reservation, where he would live for the rest of his life. He died in 1891. He is buried in Goodwill, South Dakota.
