= Bde Maka Ska Public Art Project =

Art project in Minneapolis, Minnesota

- Artist: Angela Two Stars, Sandy Spieler, Mona Smith
- Year: 2018
- Type: Public Art
- Subject: History of Minneapolis, Minnesota
- Location: Minneapolis, Minnesota; 44.935804°N 93.305785°W
- Website: bdemakaska.net

The Bde Maka Ska Public Art Project is part of the Minneapolis Park and Recreation Board's Bde Maka Ska–Harriet Master Plan. In parallel with (but separate from) the restoring the name of Lake Calhoun to its Dakota name, Bde Maka Ska, a public art project was initiated to commemorate Ḣeyata Oṭuŋwe, a 19th-century Dakota agricultural community on the southeast bank of Bde Maka Ska, and its founder, Dakota leader Maḣpiya Wic̣aṡṭa (Cloud Man).

== Project elements ==
The project's artwork pieces, collectively "Zaníyaŋ Yutḣókc̣a" (Brave Change), include a public gathering place with a circular stone seating area, ornamental panels forming a railing, and a pedestrian path with stampings depicting and naming various local crops (notably corn and wild rice) and wildlife.

The site incorporates an existing memorial plaque, reading, "To perpetuate the memory of the Sioux or Dakota Indians who occupied this region for more than two centuries prior to the treaties of 1851. This tablet is erected by the Minnesota Society of Daughters of the American Colonists, 1930."

A project website includes material on the history of the site and of the project itself. Interpretive signage, a collaboration between the park board and descendants, (pending funding) is planned for the project's next step.

Ornamental Panels
Dakota	English
OHIŊNINAŊ DED WAṬI KTE	I will always live here.
ḢEYATA OṬUŊWE	The village away from the river (Cloud Man's Village; Eatonville)
WAC̣IŊṬANKA	perseverance
WÓOḢAŊWAṠTE	generosity
WÓWADITAKE	courage
DAḲOTA WIC̣OḢAŊ	Dakota way of life

Path Stampings
Dakota	English
TAŊYAŊ YAHI	welcome (at south entrance)
HOĠAŊ	fish
WAḢCÁ	flower, purple cone
WAŊBDÍ	eagle
P̣EŻÍḢOTA	sage
TÁHCA	deer
PSÍŊ	wild rice
MAṬÓ	bear
C̣AŊPÁ	chokecherry
ṬAṬÁŊKA	buffalo
ḲÉYA	turtle
TAŊYAŊ YAHI	welcome (at north entrance)

== See also ==
- East Bde Maka Ska, Minneapolis
- Sioux language writing systems
