= Bde Maka Ska =

Lake in Minneapolis, Minnesota, United States of America

- Lake Calhoun
- Bdé Makhá Ská (Dakota)
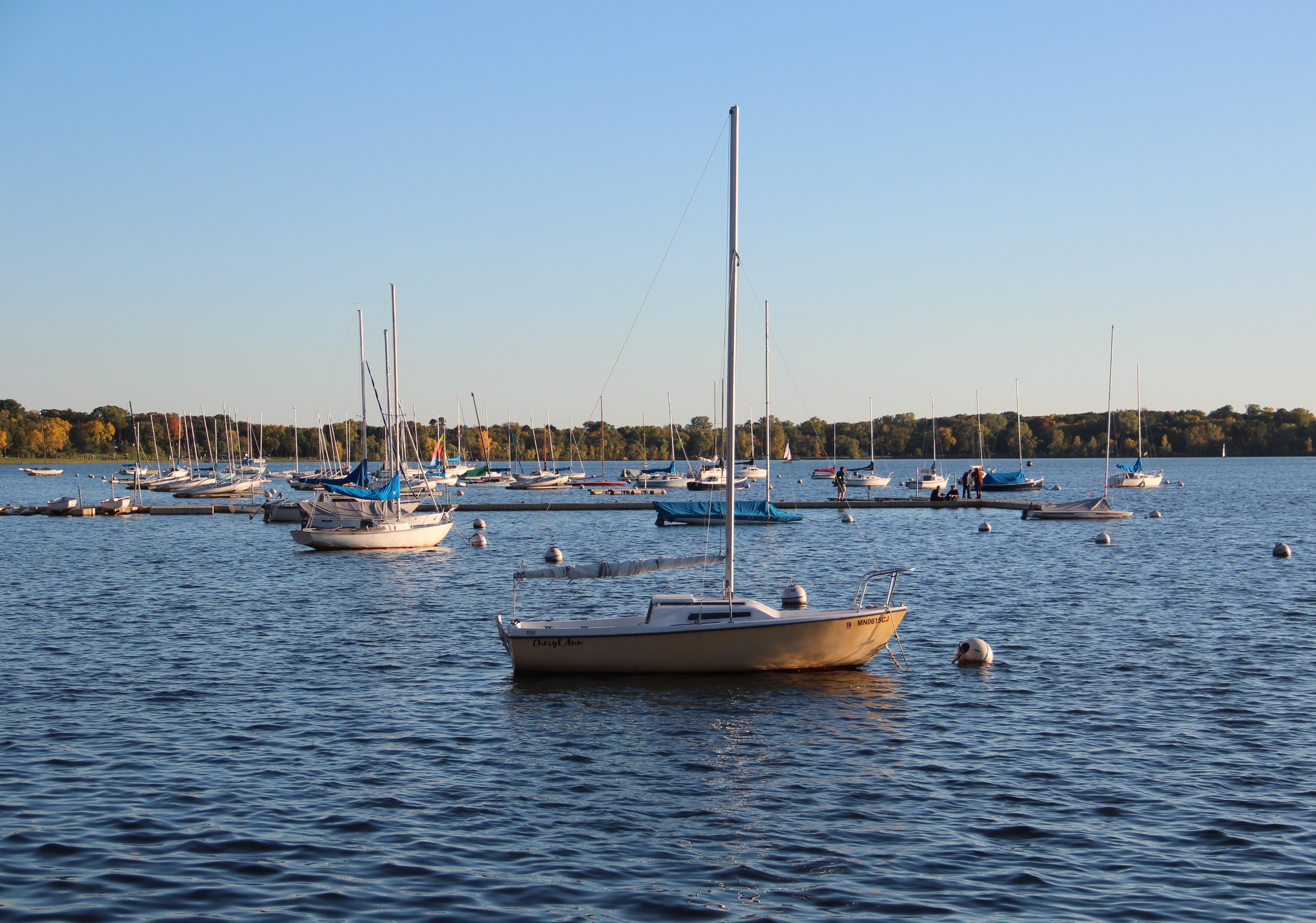
- Boats on the lake in 2017

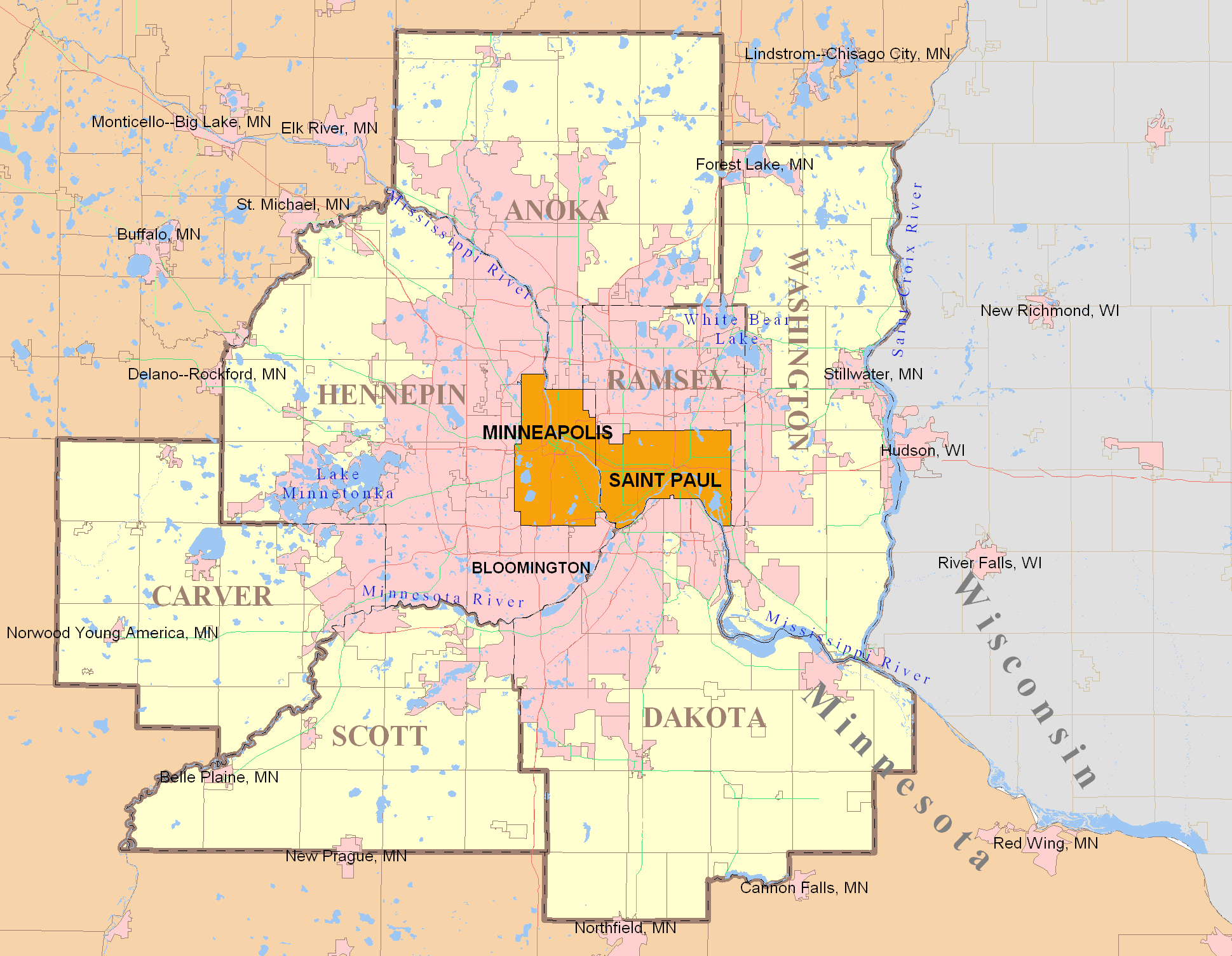
- Location within Minneapolis–Saint Paul
- Interactive map of Bde Maka Ska
- Location: Minneapolis, Minnesota
- Coordinates: 44°56′30″N 93°18′45″W
- Lake type: Glacial
- Basin countries: United States
- Surface area: 424 acres (1.72 km^{2})
- Average depth: 33 ft (10 m)
- Max. depth: 90 ft (27 m)
- Shore length^{1}: 3.1 mi (5.0 km)
- ^{1} Shore length is not a well-defined measure.

Bde Maka Ska (/bəˈdeɪ məˈkɑː skɑː/ bə-DAY mə-KAH skah; formerly known as Lake Calhoun) is the largest lake in Minneapolis, Minnesota, United States, and part of the city's Chain of Lakes. Surrounded by city park land and circled by bike and walking trails, it is popular for many outdoor activities. The lake has an area of 424 acres (1.72 km^{2}) and a maximum depth of 90 feet (27 m).

== Geology ==
Bde Maka Ska and other lakes in the Chain of Lakes were formed by glacial activity 10,000 to 12,000 years ago. Long before Bde Maka Ska took shape, interglacial rivers created valleys in the Twin Cities region potentially 100 to 250 metres (330 to 820 ft) deep, which were gradually filled in by glacial movement. According Myrbo et al., some of these valleys "overprinted on the deeper [Mississippi] river paleochannels." The final recession of the Laurentide ice sheet, mainly the Superior lobe, deposited sediment and glacial ice blocks in these valleys, eventually forming kettle lakes like Bde Maka Ska. Bde Maka Ska is the deepest member of the Chain of Lakes and Minneapolis lakes as a whole.

Before human settlement, Bde Maka Ska and the Chain of Lakes were mostly surrounded by bogs and marshes that slowly grew in the depressions left behind by glacial movement. Between 1911 and 1924, Bde Maka Ska was dredged and these wetlands were filled in. Since human settlement, the water quality of Bde Maka Ska and the Chain of Lakes has declined. The Chain of Lakes watershed was polluted by 19th-century agricultural development and 20th-century storm sewer drainage systems. This increased phosphorus concentrations in the lake, leading to eutrophication. In 1990, restoration efforts in the Chain of Lakes watershed began due to public pressure over poor water quality. Over the next decade, public awareness campaigns about stormwater runoff, regulations for phosphorus in fertilizer, and targeted sediment management improved the Chain of Lakes' water quality. Bde Maka Ska showed the largest improvement, reaching phosphorus levels only slightly above pre-settlement conditions.

== History ==
=== Ḣeyate Otuŋwe ===
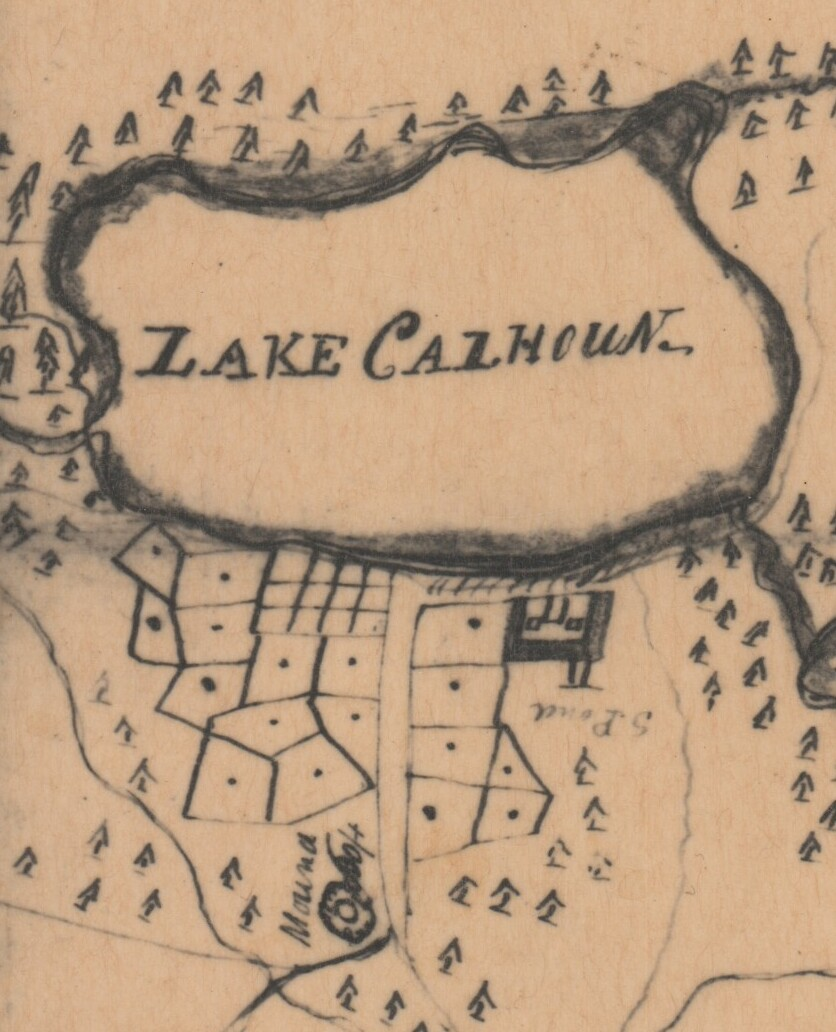
Map of Ḣeyate Otuŋwe drawn by Lawrence Taliaferro in 1835.

Bde Maka Ska and the wetlands surrounding it provided game, fish, and wild rice for Dakota in the years before contact with European settlers. No permanent settlement was observed before 1828. Between 1829 and 1839, Bde Maka Ska was the site of the Bdewákhathuŋwaŋ Dakota agricultural village known as Ḣeyate Otuŋwe. This village began as an effort by Indian agent Lawrence Taliaferro to encourage Dakota living in the area to adopt European agricultural practices. The Dakota chief Cloud Man led the village, which by 1832 produced enough corn to trade with the settlers. The Dakota in Ḣeyate Otuŋwe not only traded corn but also shared it with neighboring bands. Ḣeyate Otuŋwe even became a popular tourist destination for white travelers starting in 1835. George Catlin painted the village in 1836.

In 1834, missionaries Gideon and Samuel Pond arrived at Fort Snelling with the goal of learning the Dakota language to convert the Dakota to Christianity. There, they met Lawrence Taliaferro, who asked them to live at Ḣeyate Otuŋwe. Taliaferro believed that agricultural life was a necessary precondition for the Dakota to convert, writing:

...before you ask him to seek for eternal happiness, teach him to worship the true and living God through the self-evident developments of his mother earth. In fine, let agriculture and the arts precede the preaching of the gospel, after which, Christianity inculcate if practicable.

— Lawrence Taliaferro, Letter to Samuel Pond, 1834

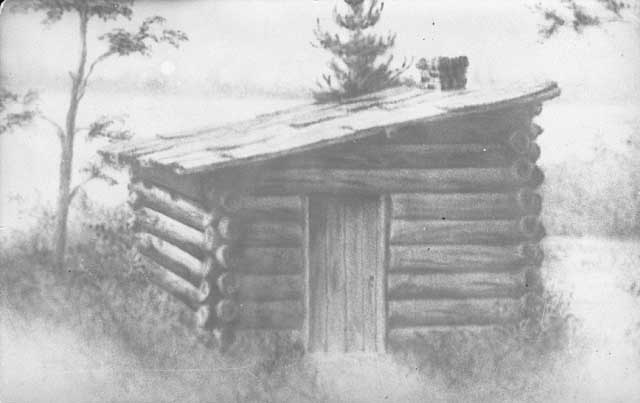
Cabin of missionaries Samuel and Gideon Pond, 1835.

The Pond brothers soon built a cabin on the east side of Bde Maka Ska. Taliaferro hired them to oversee the village, work the land, and "instruct them in the arts & habits of civilised life." Taliaferro also gave the Ponds supplies to continue growing crops. In the summer of 1835, a competing mission on Lake Harriet formed, led by Reverend Jedediah D. Stevens and seeking to build a school that taught Dakota children. Stevens persuaded the Ponds to move away from Ḣeyate Otuŋwe to help with his mission, but by the summer of 1837, the Ponds left Stevens's mission, with Samuel Pond citing Stevens's refusal to let him preach as a layman.

Throughout this time, Ḣeyate Otuŋwe grew in population and was producing higher crop volumes. On August 8, 1835, village leadership requested funds from Taliaferro for winter crop storage, making note of the many children who had come to Ḣeyate Otuŋwe with fathers who were officers at Fort Snelling and abandoned them.

In April 1838, Ojibwe chief Hole-in-the-Day of Crow Wing killed several Dakota in revenge for a previous attack; some of the Dakota he killed were related to Cloud Man. This was part of an ongoing escalation in the region of the Dakota-Ojibwe War. In July of that year, some members of Cloud Man's band retaliated by killing a member of Hole-in-the-Day's band. Tensions between the Bdewákhathuŋwaŋ Dakota and Ojibwe culminated in a June 1839 meeting at Fort Snelling, where after an apparent peace was reached, a surprise Ojibwe attack was launched near Lake Harriet, killing Cloud Man's son-in-law. This led to many battles between the Ojibwe and Dakota, putting Ḣeyate Otuŋwe under constant threat of attack. This instability led Stevens to abandon his mission on Lake Harriet, and after August 1839, Taliaferro resigned from his position as Indian agent, leaving Ḣeyate Otuŋwe with little support from Fort Snelling or local missionaries. Fort Snelling's military leadership also forced Native American settlements such as Ḣeyate Otuŋwe to move elsewhere. Ultimately, Ḣeyate Otuŋwe was abandoned by Cloud Man and its inhabitants in favor of a site known as Oak Grove, on the banks of the Minnesota River in Bloomington. The Oak Grove mission was started by Samuel and Gideon Pond, who joined Cloud Man to continue trying to convert the Dakota to Christianity.

=== Residential development and recreation ===
By the late 1850s and 1860s, Minneapolis was increasing in population, with large swaths of land available for sale. The largest surges in development around Bde Maka Ska began when the Minneapolis, Lyndale, and Minnetonka Railway Company started operating in 1879. Bde Maka Ska was seen as an attractive tourist destination, and many people invested in resorts and property along the lake. The largest of the resorts was The Lyndale, which opened in 1883 but was destroyed by fire in 1885. Even before its destruction, The Lyndale had struggled to compete with resorts on Lake Minnetonka, and it was not rebuilt. Over time, the railway lost money and was sold to the Minneapolis Street Railway in 1887.

Despite plans for a resort community on Bde Maka Ska failing to materialize, residential neighborhoods began to arise around the lake. By 1883, a neighborhood known as Cottage City was built to provide small houses for middle-class residents looking to get away from the city. Like much of the early urban development in Minneapolis, a stop on the streetcar line attracted residents. Over time, many of these homes were replaced by larger residences, now part of the Linden Hills neighborhood. East Bde Maka Ska follows parts of the aforementioned Minneapolis, Lyndale, and Minnetonka Railway, with luxurious homes being erected around the time of the railway's existence.

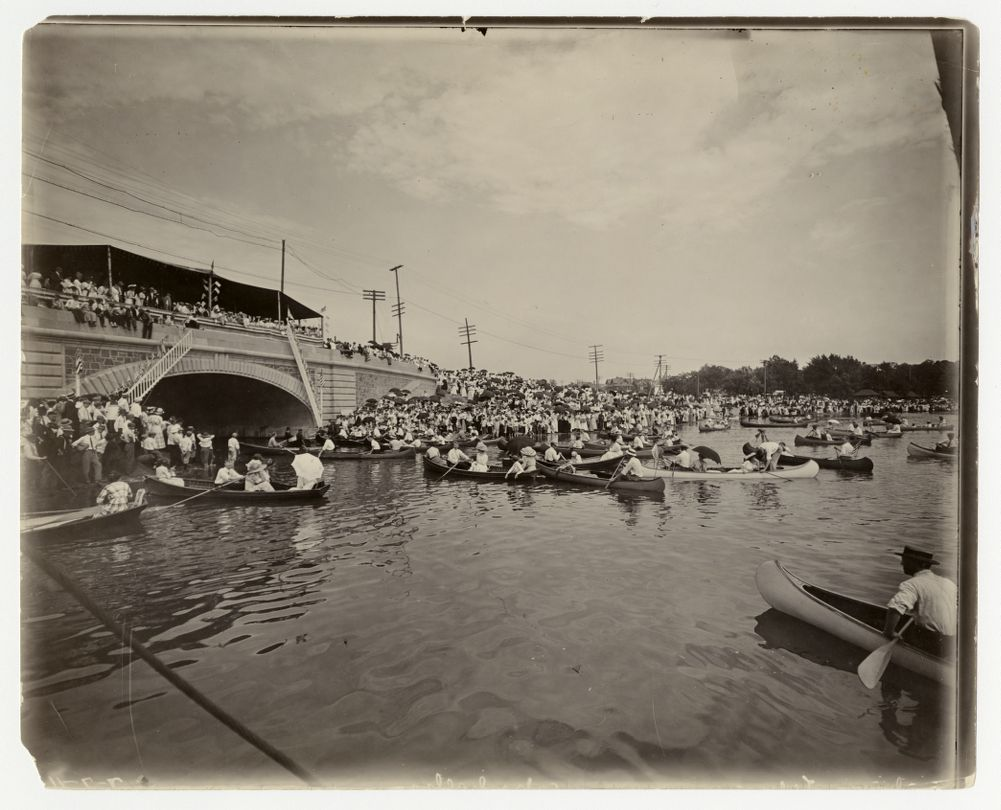
Residents celebrate the opening of the channel between Lake of the Isles and Bde Maka Ska.

During the time Bde Maka Ska was becoming a residential tourist attraction, many saw the lakeshore, which largely existed as a swamp, as undesirable. This public sentiment led the Minneapolis Park and Recreation Board to dredge the Chain of Lakes, including Bde Maka Ska. This dredging formed much of the landscape around Bde Maka Ska today. In 1906, the MPRB began connecting Cedar Lake, Lake of the Isles, and Bde Maka Ska with channels. When the project was completed in 1911, over 100,000 people celebrated its opening. After the channels opened, the MPRB began renting rowboats to residents and running cruises between the connected lakes.

Even before the lake was dredged, the lake was commonly used for sports and recreation. By the late 1870s, boating clubs regularly hosted regattas on it. Sailing, a common activity on Bde Maka Ska today, was formally organized as early as 1901 by what was then called the Calhoun Yacht Club.

== Lake and surrounding area ==
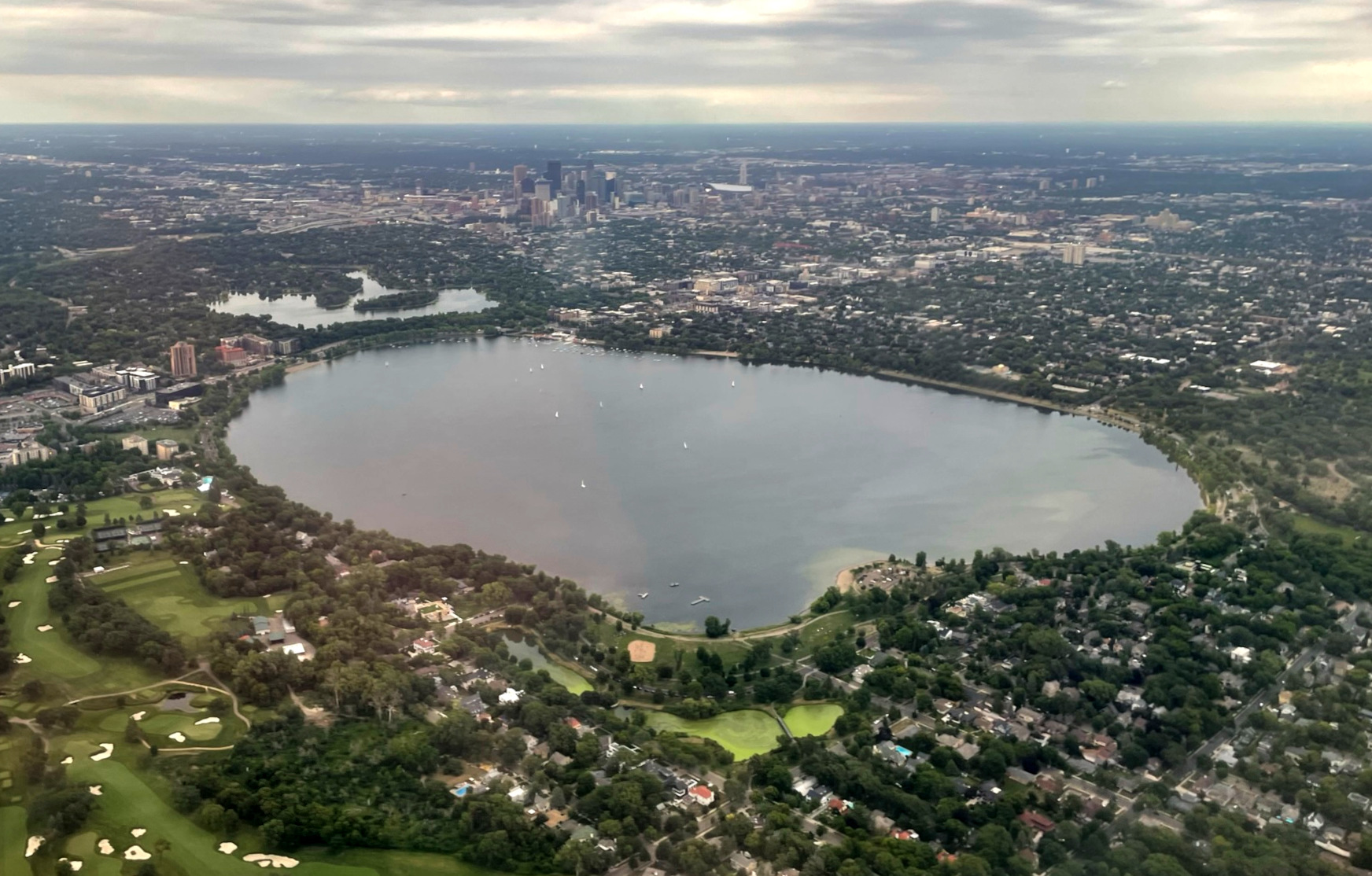
Aerial photo of Bde Maka Ska viewed from the south

Bde Maka Ska is part of the Grand Rounds National Scenic Byway, connecting with Lake of the Isles on the northeast, Cedar Lake and Brownie Lake on the northwest, and Lake Harriet on the south. The Minneapolis Park and Recreation Board trail system has a 3.4-mile (5.5 km) trail around the lake for bicyclists and skaters and a 3.2-mile (5.1 km) trail around it for pedestrians. Both trails connect to the larger trail system via connections to Lake of the Isles and Lake Harriet. In addition, the Midtown Greenway Trail is just north of the lake and Lake Street. The lake itself is popular for canoeing, kayaking, and windsurfing, and has three swimming beaches.

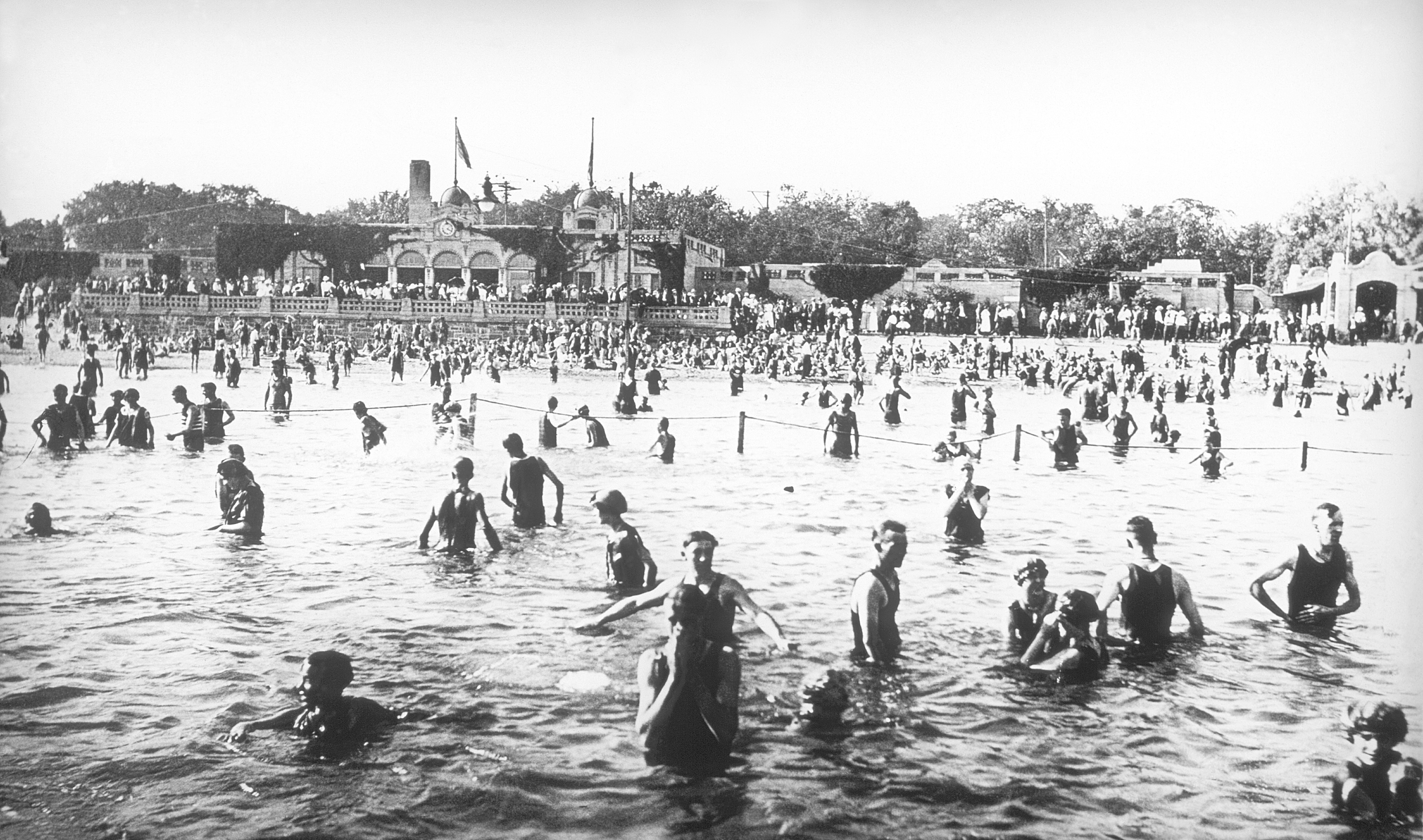
Bathers at the lake, about 1917

The three beaches are North Beach on the north side of the lake, 32nd Beach on the east, and Thomas Beach on the south. Bde Maka Ska Park and the surrounding parkland offer parking, picnicking, volleyball, and athletic fields. It also hosts the Minneapolis Sailing Center, local high school teams, and the University of St. Thomas sailing team. A pavilion on the lake's northeast side has outdoor seating, a restaurant, a small performance stage, all-gender restrooms, bicycle parking, and a boat launch.

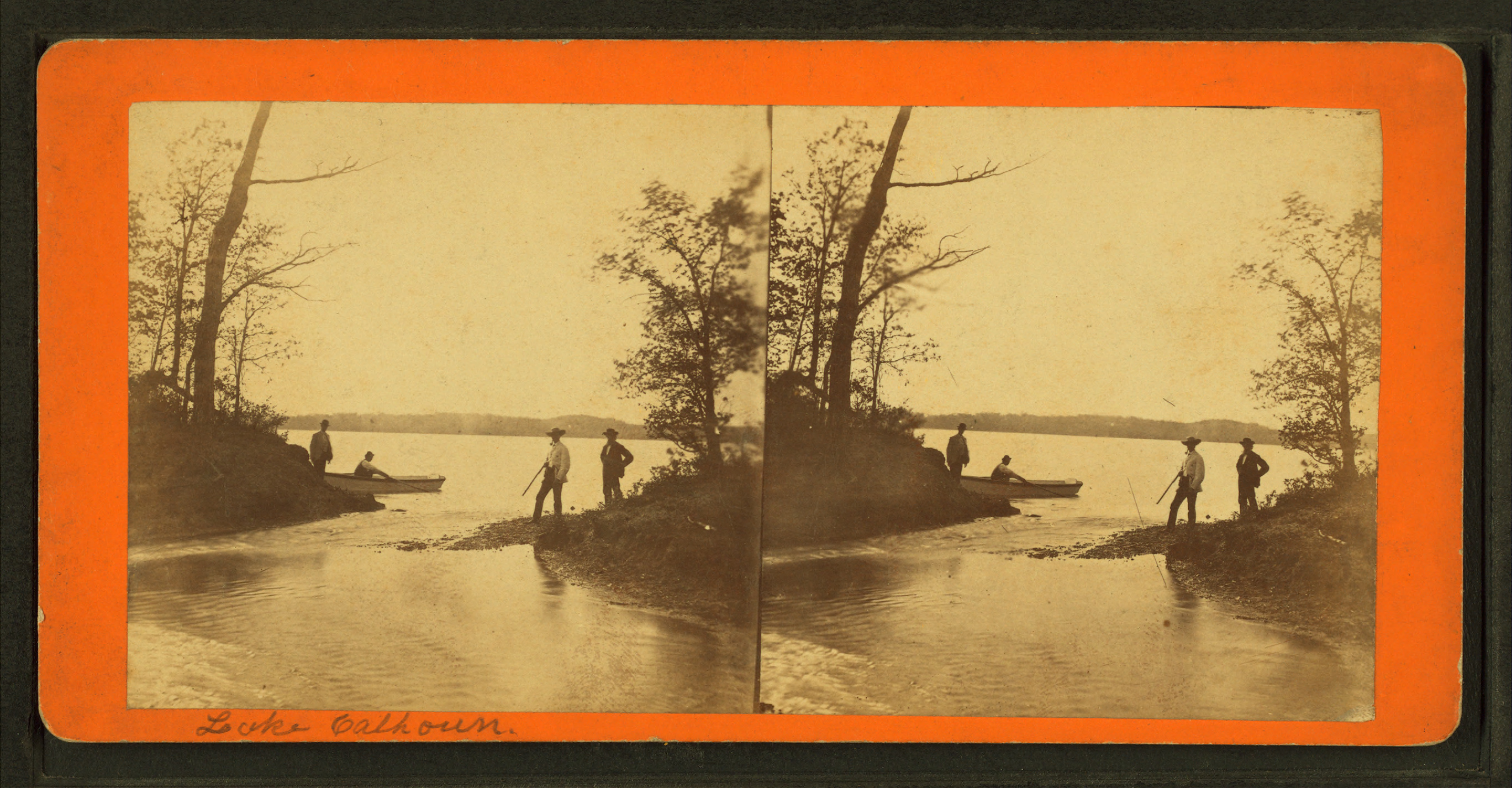
Stereoscopic image of the lake by Benjamin Franklin Upton

In 2019, the Bde Maka Ska Public Art Project was completed on the site of Ḣeyate Otuŋwe. A plaque on the lake's east side commemorates the mission station built by Samuel and Gideon Pond where they created the first alphabet for the Dakota language at Cloudman's Village. On the west side is The Bakken, an old mansion with medicinal gardens and a library and museum devoted to medical electricity and the history of electromagnetism. The Como-Harriet Streetcar Line operates between the lake and Lake Harriet.

== Naming ==
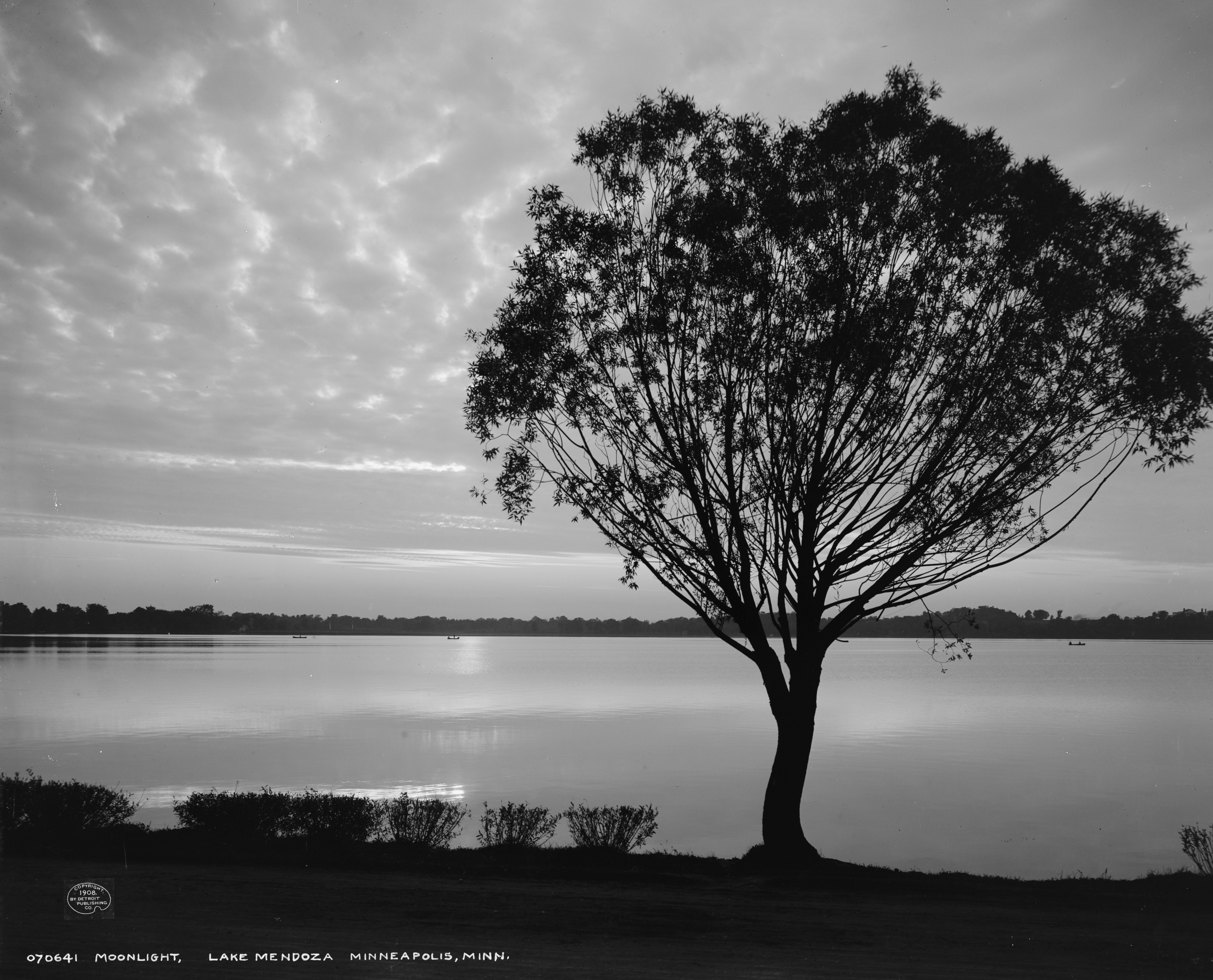
"Lake Medoza" (as it was sometimes called) in 1908

=== Historic names ===
The Dakota originally called the lake Mde Maka Ska (standardized Lakota/Dakota spelling Bdé Makhá Ská; English approximation: "Be-DAY Mah-KAH-Ska") meaning "Lake White Earth" or "Lake White Bank", a name that probably was given by the Ioway who inhabited the area until the 16th century. Another Dakota name for the lake may have been Mde Med'oza, the name initially adopted by settlers, either as Lake Medoza or in translation as Loon Lake. The Dakota also described it as Heyate Mde, meaning "the set back lake".

=== Calhoun naming ===
As United States Secretary of War, John C. Calhoun sent the Army to survey the area surrounding Fort Snelling in 1817. Calhoun had also authorized the construction of Fort Snelling, one of the earliest U.S. settlements in the state. The surveyors named the water body "Lake Calhoun" in his honor, and Lieutenant James L. Thompson's 1839 Fort Snelling Military Reservation survey map shows that name for the lake.

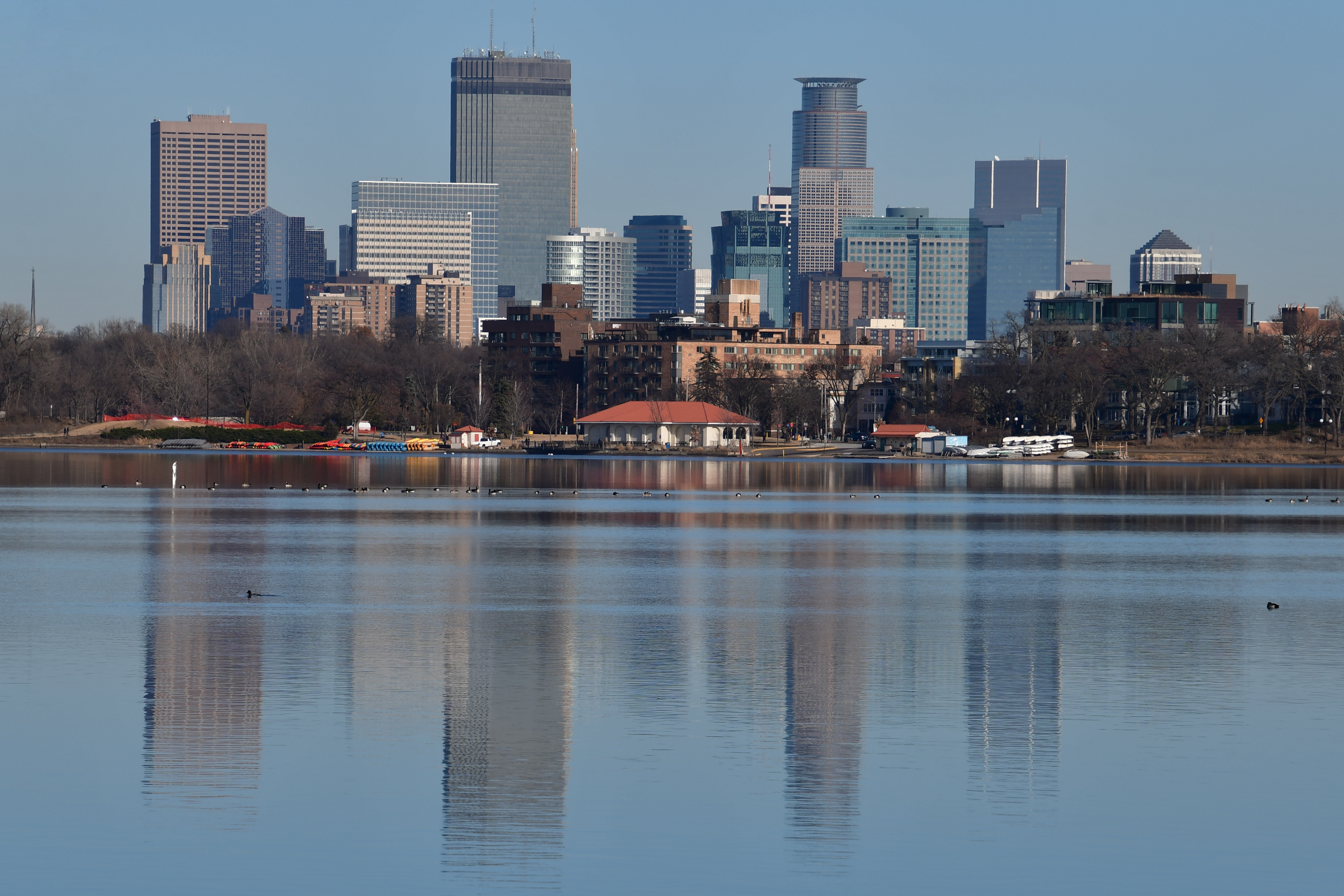
The downtown Minneapolis skyline and refectory building reflected in the lake in 2017

=== Calhoun–Bde Maka Ska naming dispute ===
Calhoun's legacy as a slaveowner and pro-slavery politician led critics to question whether he should be honored. In 2011 the Minneapolis Park and Recreation Board (MPRB) took up the issue. Its legal counsel concluded that the board could not legally change the name, as state law gives that power to the Commissioner of Natural Resources, and then only in the first 40 years after the name was designated. After the Charleston church shooting in June 2015, a fresh drive to change the name started via an online petition and the MPRB said it would look into whether it could change the lake's name through state action. The Star Tribune published an article quoting Calhoun's views on the black race (see 1840 census controversy):

The number of deaf and dumb, blind, idiots and insane of the Negroes in the States that have changed the ancient relations between the races [and are no longer slaves] is one out of every ninety-six; while in the States adhering to it [slavery], it is one out of every six hundred and sixty-one; being nearly six to one against the free blacks in the same state

and reporting that he had ordered the flogging of one of his slaves. In fall 2015, the board added the Dakota name to signage below the official name. In March 2016, an advisory group decided by majority vote to urge the MPRB to restore the lake's former name. There was also a proposal to rename the lake for Senator Paul Wellstone, who is buried in nearby Lakewood Cemetery.

In 2017, the MPRB voted unanimously to recommend changing the lake's name to Bde Maka Ska, and the Hennepin County commissioners agreed. In January 2018, the Minnesota Department of Natural Resources (DNR) made Bde Maka Ska the official name in Minnesota. To change it at the federal level, the state submitted materials to the U.S. Board on Geographic Names, which approved the change in June 2018. Park signs around the lake use only the name Bde Maka Ska.

On April 29, 2019, the Minnesota Court of Appeals reversed the DNR's decision, holding that a name that had been in use more than 40 years could be changed only by the legislature. The MPRB said it would continue to keep the signage of Bde Maka Ska at the lake and Minneapolis Mayor Jacob Frey said, "I will continue to call Bde Maka Ska by its rightful name. That was the lake's name before people who look like me renamed it to honor a slavery apologist and as far as I'm concerned that is still its name today". The DNR appealed the court decision, and released a statement confirming that the federal Board on Geographic Names (BGN) had adopted Bde Maka Ska as the lake's official name. Executive secretary of the U.S. Board on Geographic Names Lou Yost said, "State legislation (or court ruling) is not binding on the Federal Government. The name at the Federal level will remain Bde Maka Ska as was approved at the BGN's June 21, 2018 meeting". The Minnesota Court of Appeals decision was appealed to the Minnesota Supreme Court, which heard oral arguments on November 13, 2019. On May 13, 2020, the Minnesota Supreme Court ruled that the Minnesota Department of Natural Resources had the authority to rename the lake Bde Maka Ska, ruling that the law restricting renaming applied only to county boards, not to the DNR.

== Wildlife ==
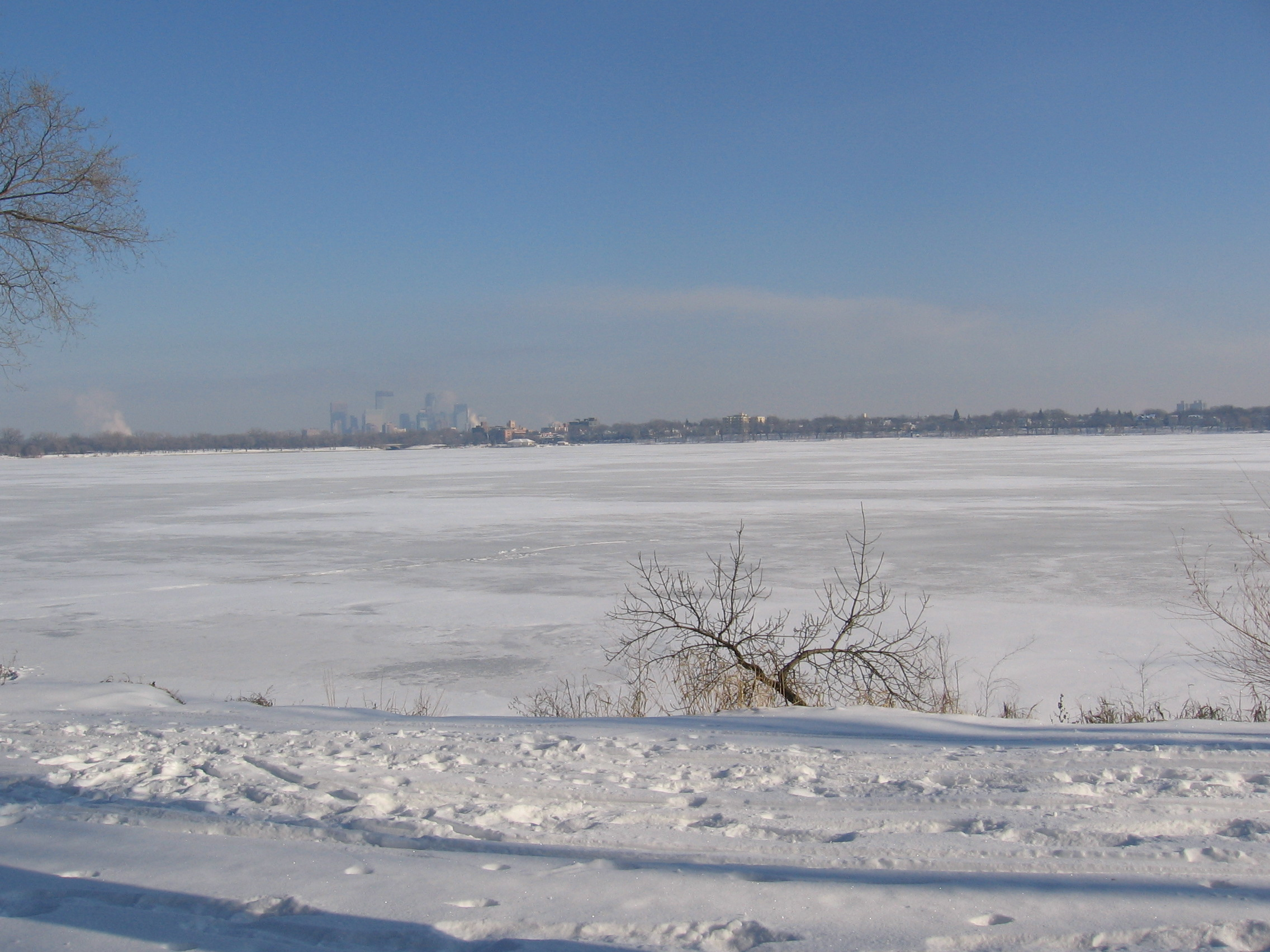
The lake, covered with ice and snow in December

The lake contains black crappie, bluegill, bowfin, common carp, hybrid sunfish, largemouth bass, northern pike, pumpkinseed, tiger muskellunge, walleye, white sucker, and yellow perch. Some fish consumption guideline restrictions have been placed on the lake's bluegill, crappie, largemouth bass, northern pike, walleye, and white sucker due to mercury and perfluorooctanesulfonic acid contamination.

In 1991, the then-Minnesota state record tiger muskellunge at 33 pounds 8 ounces (15.2 kg) was caught in the lake. The Minneapolis Park and Recreation website lists the lake as one of the best in the city for ice fishing walleye, northern pike, and crappies.

Zebra mussels, an aquatic invasive species, were found in the lake in 2018.

== See also ==
- List of lakes in Minneapolis
- List of shared-use paths in Minneapolis
