= Bloomington Cemetery =

Cemetery in Bloomington, Minnesota, USA

- First Presbyterian Church of Oak Grove Cemetery
- U.S. National Register of Historic Places
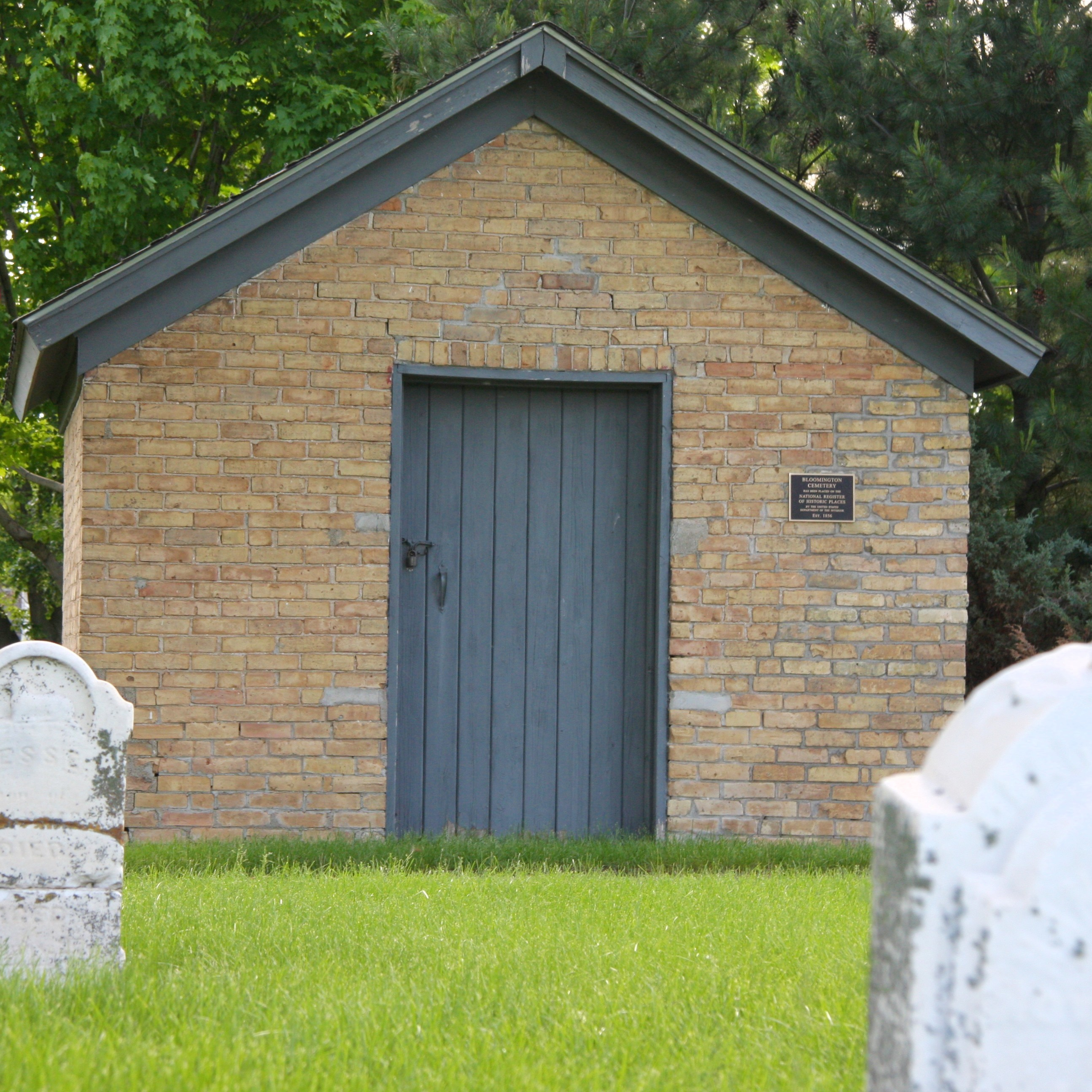

- Location within Minnesota Location within the United States
- Location: 10340 Lyndale Avenue, South, Bloomington, Minnesota
- Coordinates: 44°48′55″N 93°17′23″W
- Built: 1894
- NRHP reference No.: 14000956
- Added to NRHP: November 24, 2014

Bloomington Cemetery, historically called the First Presbyterian Church of Oak Grove Cemetery, is a cemetery in Bloomington, Minnesota, United States. Established in 1856, its pioneer and Dakota burials and 1890 soldiers' monument reflect the city's transition from frontier settlement to participant in state affairs like military service. Missionary Gideon Pond is buried there.
