= Hazelwood Republic =

Experimental Dakota state, 1856 to 1862

- July 29, 1856–November 7, 1862
- Religion: Christianity
- Demonym: Hazelwood Republican/Hazelwood Dakota
- Government: Democratic Republic
- President
  - 1856–1860: Paul Mazakutemani
  - 1860–1862: Simon Anawangmani
- Secretary
  - 1862: Enoch Marpiya-hdi-na-pe (Acting)
- History
  - Established: July 29, 1856
  - Disestablished: November 7, 1862
- Today part of: United States (Minnesota)

The Hazelwood Republic was a Dakota state formed in 1856. It was an experimental attempt by a group of Dakota to westernize themselves to be treated as equals by the United States government.

In 1854, many of the Dakota homes in Lac qui Parle burned down. The now homeless Dakota, along with missionary Stephen R. Riggs, then moved further north, near the Upper Sioux Agency. They settled close to where Granite Falls is today. The new settlement was built out of wooden structures akin to those used by the Americans, and was called Hazelwood. A church and school were built.

== Founding ==
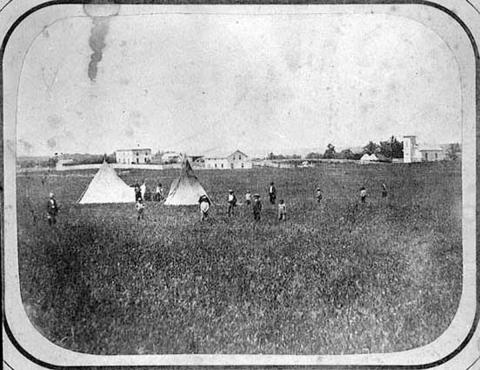
The Hazelwood Republic, 1860

The Hazelwood Republic was founded on July 29, 1856. That same day, the constitution was adopted, signed by seventeen men.

The constitution was structured as follows:

(a): Recognition of Christianity as the state religion.

(b): Dedication to education.

(c): Commitment to agriculture and permanent settlement.

(d): Renunciation of the traditional Dakota way of life.

(e): Diplomacy and peaceful relations with the United States and independence from the Dakota people at large.

Some of those who signed the constitution were Paul Mazakutemani, Simon Anawangmani, Lorenzo Lawrence, Robert Hopkins, Antoine Baptiste, Micheal Baptiste, and John Baptiste.

Paul Mazakutemani, cousin of Little Crow, was elected president. Presidential terms were two years. An annually elected three-member council served as the legislature.

== History ==
In 1858, the newly ratified Minnesota State Constitution then stated that Dakota could become citizens of they could 'civilize' themselves to the standards of the state. To this end, the Hazelwood Republicans attempted to earn themselves citizenship multiple times. In 1861, Hazelwood Republican Lorenzo Lawrence became the first full-blood Dakota to gain United States Citizenship. In 1860, Simon Anawangmani became president.

In 1859, the Dakota language was banned from the Hazelwood school at the direction of Stephen Riggs, who believed this would hasten the introduction of Christianity into the society.

== Dakota War and Decline ==
The US-Dakota War of 1862 began on August 18, 1862. Two days later, the white population of the Republic fled. The Republic remained neutral. Former president Mazakutemani attempted to convince an early war party to lay down their arms, saying;

The Americans are a great people. They have much lead, powder, guns, and provisions. Stop fighting, and now gather up all the captives and give them to me. No one who fights with the white people ever becomes rich, or remains two days in one place, but is always fleeing and starving.

— Paul Mazakutemani

President Anawangmani established the wartime Dakota Peace Coalition, in an attempt to create a league of pacifist Dakota in the hopes they would be spared any punishment the other Dakota may face. Despite this, the Republic was not spared the fate of the other remaining Dakota in Minnesota. Those who had not already fled were forcibly marched to the concentration camp at Fort Snelling on November 7, 1862.

== Presidents ==
| No. | Portrait | Name (Birth–Death) | Term of office |
|---|---|---|---|
| 1 | | Paul Mazakutemani (1806–1887) | 1856–1860 |
| 2 | | Simon Anawangmani; 1808–1891 | 1860–1862 |
