= Lawrence Taliaferro =

American Army officer (1794–1871)

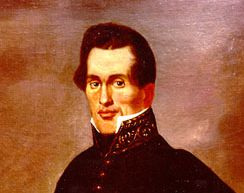
- Lawrence Taliaferro in a portrait from about 1830.
- Born: February 28, 1794; Whitehall Plantation in King George County, Virginia
- Died: January 22, 1871 (aged 76)
- Military career
- Allegiance: United States of America
- Service years: 1812–1813 (Virginia Militia); 1813–ca. 1837 (US Army)

Lawrence Taliaferro (/ˈtɒlɪvər/ TOL-iv-ər; February 28, 1794 – January 22, 1871) was a United States Army officer who served as an Indian agent at Fort Snelling, Minnesota from 1820 through 1839. He was also part of the famous enslaved African American Dred Scott's struggle for freedom.

== Biography ==
Taliaferro was born at Whitehall Plantation in King George County, Virginia to James Garnett Taliaferro and his wife Wilhelmina (Wishart) Taliaferro. During the War of 1812, he enlisted at age 18 as a volunteer in a Virginia militia company. He was soon selected to study for a regular Army commission, and was made an ensign of the 1st United States Infantry Regiment in July 1813. He chose to remain in the Army after the war, intending to make it his career.

Taliaferro partnered with Colonel Josiah Snelling to ensure peace and safety for the frontier outpost. His role was to mediate between the American Fur Company traders, the Ojibwe and Dakota in the area, and United States interests. This was a difficult task, as evidenced by his diary: "How to get rid of me at this Post seems now the main object of Tom, Dick, and Harry — so that those who may come after me can the more easily be bribed or threatened into silence and acquiesce in the plans on foot to cheat & destroy the Indians."

Taliaferro encouraged the Dakota to rely less on hunting and more on farming, as a response to their difficulties in hunting at that time. However, most Dakota were not willing to do so, as they considered farming the way of the white men.

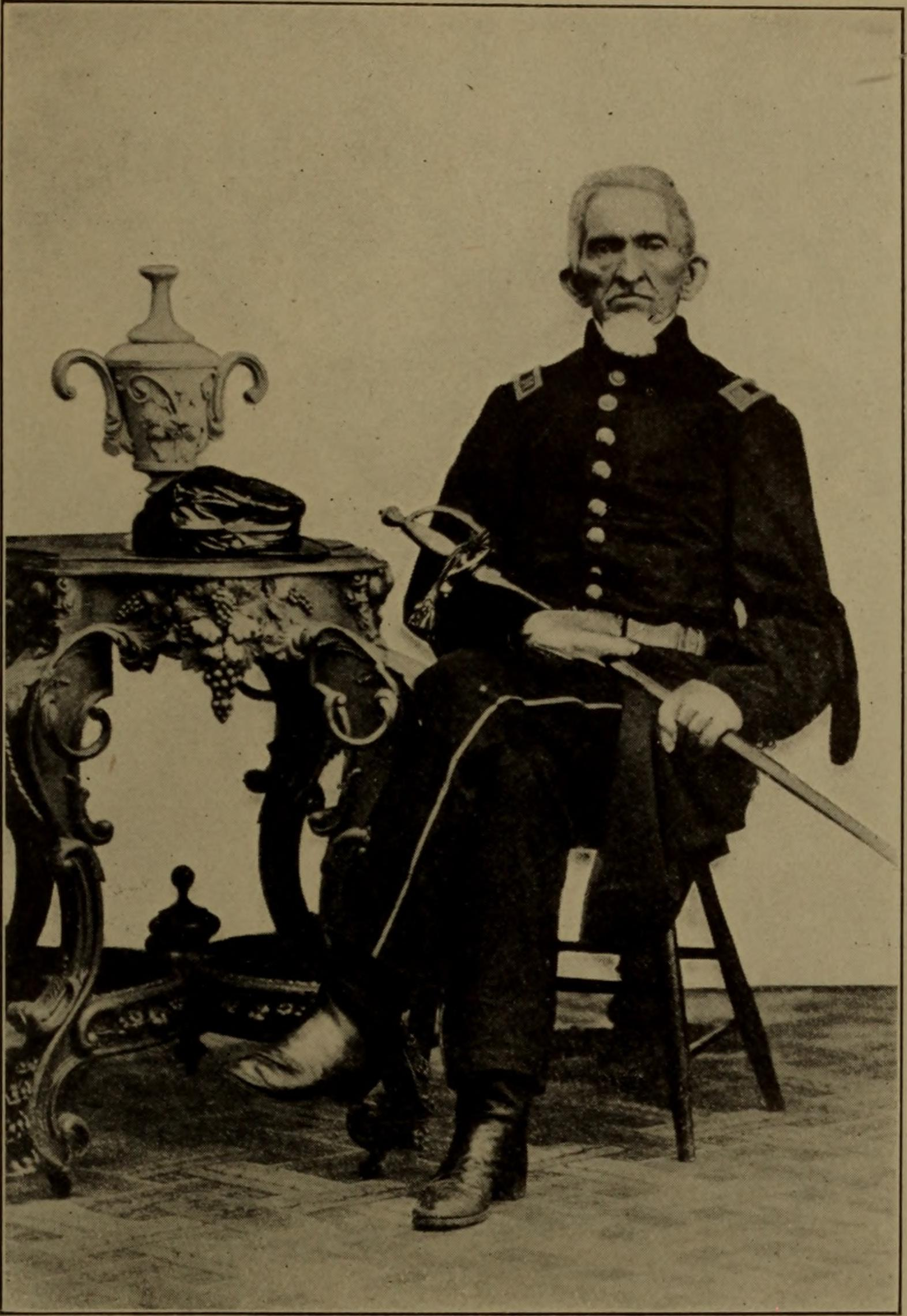
Major Lawrence Taliaferro

Taliaferro had previously served with Josiah Snelling at the battle of Fort Erie in the War of 1812. They were close friends as well as professional allies. Chief Little Crow once told Taliaferro there was "no sugar in your mouth," for his honesty and for his record of not making promises that he could not keep. Taliaferro built a council house just west of the fort in 1823, where he received Native American visitors and mediated in the affairs of the area. Both the Dakota and the Ojibwe would travel along the Minnesota and Mississippi Rivers to the fort to seek advice and to ask for charity and favors. Taliaferro was able to exert his influence by distributing supplies such as food, gunpowder, tobacco, and whiskey. The agency's blacksmith also was on hand to repair Native Americans' guns and traps. Since the Native Americans relied on these supplies and services, and since those services could be stopped at any time, this promoted peaceful relations between all parties involved.

Taliaferro presided over the drafting of a treaty in 1837. He brought Dakota leaders to Washington, D.C., and negotiated what he thought were fair terms for Dakota lands east of the Mississippi River. Unfortunately, the United States government did not keep up its end of the bargain. The Dakota ended up debt-ridden and desperate for their means of survival, and Taliaferro became increasingly critical of the United States' inability to make good on their promises. In poor health, he resigned his position and left the Army.

== Dred Scott connection ==
Taliaferro was the enslaver of at least 21 persons. One of them, named Harriet Robinson, married Dred Scott. As Justice of the Peace in the territories, Taliaferro officiated the marriage of Scott and Robinson, which many historians believe gave additional credence to the Scotts' claim to freedom. Taliaferro gave Harriet to Scott's enslaver so that the couple could live together as husband and wife.

== Tributes ==
Taliaferro (played by local actor John Wehrman) is the lead character and narrator of the 1983 film, Tower and Braid, produced by the Minnesota Historical Society and shown regularly at historic Fort Snelling's museum.

== See also ==
- List of slave owners
