= Minor attacks of the Black Hawk War =

Minor attacks
- Part of the Black Hawk War
Date	May–July, 1832
Location	present day northern Illinois and southern Wisconsin.
Result	No military result

Belligerents
United States	Various factions affiliated with the Sauk, Fox, Potawatomi, Kickapoo, and Ho-Chunk

Commanders and leaders
various	various

After the outbreak of the Black Hawk War, at the Battle of Stillman's Run in May 1832, there were minor attacks and skirmishes throughout the duration of the conflict. The war was fought between white settlers in Illinois and present-day Wisconsin and Sauk Chief Black Hawk. The relatively minor attacks of the war were widely dispersed and often carried out by bands of Native Americans that were unaffiliated with Black Hawk's British Band.

Sometime in May 1832 a Methodist minister and his wife disappeared and were subsequently tied to a tree and executed by burning by a band of Potawatomi. Also in May an attack at Holderman's Grove killed another minister, Adam Payne, and an attack at Hollenbeck's Grove drove numerous residents out of the area. In another attack, just before the Battle of Horseshoe Bend, a German immigrant named Henry Apple was killed in a Kickapoo ambush. At Ament's Cabin, near present-day Bureau County, Illinois, an attack left early settler Elijah Phillips dead. Together with other incidents during the war, these attacks helped contribute to an atmosphere of fear in the region during the war.

== Background ==
As a consequence of an 1804 treaty between the Governor of Indiana Territory and a group of Sauk and Fox leaders regarding land settlement, the tribes vacated their lands in and moved west of the Mississippi in 1828. However, Sauk Chief Black Hawk and others disputed the treaty, claiming that the full tribal councils had not been consulted, nor did those representing the tribes have authorization to cede lands. Angered by the loss of his birthplace, between 1830–31 Black Hawk led a number of incursions across the Mississippi River into Illinois, but was persuaded to return west each time without bloodshed. In April 1832, encouraged by promises of alliance with other tribes and the British, he again moved his so-called "British Band" of around 1,000 warriors and non-combatants into Illinois. Finding no allies, he attempted to return to Iowa, but the undisciplined Illinois militia's actions led to the Battle of Stillman's Run. A number of other engagements followed, and the militias of Michigan Territory and Illinois were mobilized to hunt down Black Hawk's Band. The conflict became known as the Black Hawk War.

The period between initial battle at Stillman's Run and the June 24 Battle of Apple River Fort was filled with war-related activity and events. A series of attacks at Buffalo Grove, the Plum River settlement, Fort Blue Mounds, and various attacks in other places including the war's most famous incident the Indian Creek massacre, all took place between mid-May and late June 1832. The week before the Battle of Apple River Fort was an important turning point for the militia: between 16–18 June two key battles, one at Waddams Grove and the other at Horseshoe Bend, played a role in changing public perception about the militia after its defeat at Stillman's Run.

After the inconclusive skirmish in late June at Kellogg's Grove, Black Hawk and his British Band fled the approaching militia through Wisconsin. They passed through what are now Beloit and Janesville, then followed the Rock River toward Horicon Marsh, where they headed west toward the Four Lakes region (near modern-day Madison). On July 21, 1832, the militia caught up with Black Hawk's band as they attempted to cross the Wisconsin River, near the present-day town of Roxbury, in Dane County, near Sauk City, Wisconsin. The engagement that followed is known as the Battle of Wisconsin Heights and was the penultimate battle of the war. The war would end at the Battle of Bad Axe on August 1 and 2. When the militia finally caught up with Black Hawk's "British Band" at the mouth of the Bad Axe River, hundreds of men, women and children would be killed by pursuing soldiers, their Indian allies, and a U.S. gunboat.

== Prelude ==
After the defeat of the militia at Stillman's Run the number of Native American raids and attacks increased on the frontier in the state of Illinois and Michigan Territory. Largely, these attacks were opportunistic and spread out as opposed to being part of a bigger strategy. Many of the attacks that occurred were carried out by bands of Native Americans that were unaffiliated with Black Hawk's British Band.

== Buffalo Grove ==
When the Black Hawk War began in the spring of 1832, the settlers at Buffalo Grove were notified of Black Hawk's victory at Stillman's Run and ordered to leave the grove. Most of the settlers went to Peoria where they remained for the duration of the war. On May 19, 1832 a small unit was detailed to carry dispatches from Colonel James M. Strode in Galena to General Henry Atkinson at Dixon's Ferry (present-day Dixon, Illinois). The Buffalo Grove ambush occurred near Buffalo Grove, Illinois, a small, unincorporated settlement in present-day Ogle County. On May 20, 1832, Sergeant Fred Stahl returned to Dixon's Ferry with the other four survivors of the attack and reported that his party had been ambushed by a group of Native Americans the evening before on the edge of the grove. He reported that Durley was killed instantly, scalped, and left on the spot.

== Execution of Lucy and James Sample ==
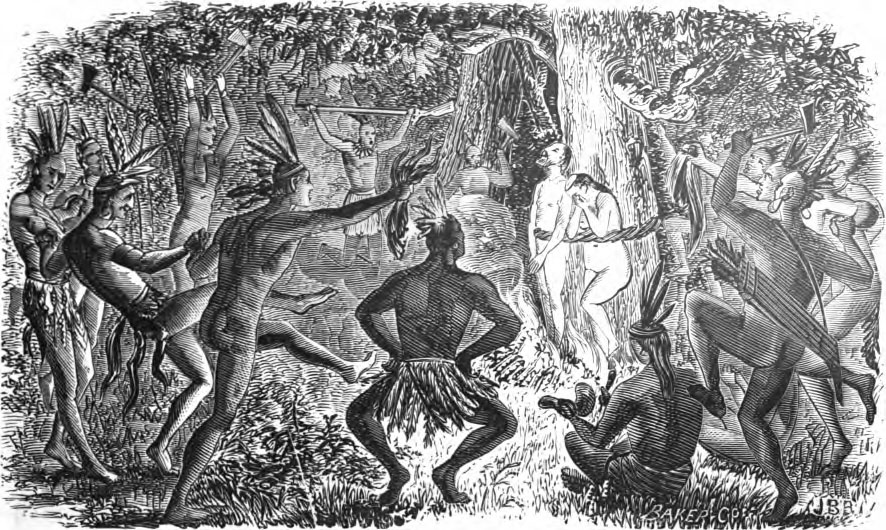
Execution of James and Lucy Sample.

In 1872, amateur historian Nehemiah Matson related a story about the execution of a couple, James and Lucy Sample, by Potawatomis. According to Matson, the two were bound to a tree and then burned to death. The executions, said Matson, were directed by a man named Mike Girty, who was supposedly a mixed race son of Simon Girty. But a 1960 profile of Matson stated that "Because of his indiscriminate mixing of fact and legend, however, scholars generally discount his books as valid sources." The story was repeated over the next few decades in other books, but modern scholarly accounts of the Black Hawk War make no mention of this event, nor do they confirm the existence of a Mike Girty.

== Holderman's Grove ==
Adam Payne was an itinerant preacher from Pennsylvania, described as a large and imposing man. Two days after the May 21 Indian Creek massacre, the Payne was traveling by horseback on what would later become the Frank & Walker stagecoach route, from Chicago to Ottawa. Payne, a minister in a denomination known as the Dunkers, passed through several areas including Holderman's Grove, Lisbon and Plainfield, Illinois. At Plainfield Payne was met by a friend, Johnathan Wilson, who warned him of danger to individuals traveling the Illinois frontier alone. Payne was at first persuaded and turned back toward Chicago at Wilson's urgings.

As he traveled toward Chicago, Payne changed his mind, ignored the warnings and turned back toward Ottawa. Payne's journey was uneventful until he approached Holderman's Grove. Payne approached the grove, about halfway between Plainfield and Ottawa, when he was ambushed by a waiting war party of Native Americans. They immediately fired their weapons and Payne was wounded through the chest. He turned his horse to flee but it was also wounded in the encounter and after a chase of 14 or 15 miles it fell dead beneath him. Unarmed, Payne was overtaken by the attackers and purportedly decapitated, one witness to the body's discovery indicated that he was only scalped and his head remained attached to his body. In the index to his 2006 book, Black Hawk: The Battle for the Heart of America, Kerry A. Trask refers to the incident as the Holderman's Grove raid.

== Hollenbeck's Grove ==
The house of a Mr. Hollenbeck was burned in Hollenbeck's Grove (or Hollenback's) on May 22, 1832, one day after the Indian Creek massacre. Other parts of the settlement at the grove were also burned and looted. Refugees from Hollenbeck's Grove joined the exodus from the Fox River valley toward Danville, passing through Plainfield on their way. In Plainfield wildly overstated claims of Native Americans burning and looting everything were passed along, greatly disturbing the already fearful residents. In the index to his 2006 book, Black Hawk: The Battle for the Heart of America, Kerry A. Trask refers to the incident as the Hollenback's Grove raid.

== Henry Apple ==
On June 11, Henry Dodge escorted General Hugh Brady to the mouth of the Fox River to confer with overall commander General Henry Atkinson. Dodge left the conference with clear authority from Atkinson to deal with the war-related violence in the mining region. After the meeting, he first traveled to his home fort, at Gratiot's Grove, which he reached on June 13. The Spafford Farm massacre occurred the following day, and Dodge and his command set out for Fort Hamilton as soon as he heard about it, stopping at Fort Blue Mounds for supplies. On the way to Hamilton, the soldiers passed a German immigrant, Henry Apple, exchanged greetings and kept traveling.

About 150 yards (140 m) from the spot they met a Kickapoo ambush was set up in wait, probably for Dodge, who had ventured off the main road. Apple approached the ambush site and Dodge later reported hearing three guns, one of the shots killed Apple. Dodge was probably saved by his last minute decision to make a detour from the main route. Apple's horse galloped wildly past the men, wounded and carrying a large amount of blood in its saddle. The horse continued all the way to Fort Hamilton, where it raised a furor among the inhabitants.

After hearing the attack on Apple in the distance, Dodge continued on toward Fort Hamilton (present-day Wiota, Wisconsin), gathered a company of 29 mounted volunteers on arrival and sped off to intercept that band. He led the chase through tangled underbrush until, breaking into prairie, they caught sight of the raiding party. The Kickapoo crossed the Pecatonica River within sight of the pursuing militia, and entered into a swamp. The militia crossed the swollen river and dismounted when they reached the swamp and the Battle of Horseshoe Bend ensued.

== Ament's Cabin ==
The site of Ament's cabin was settled in 1829 when John L. Ament and his brother Justin staked claim on adjacent claims Berlin and Dover Townships, in present-day Bureau County, Illinois. Shortly after settling, Elijah Phillips bought Justin Ament's land and built his own cabin. West of Ament's and Phillips' settlement was a large Native American sugar camp, part of this camp was included in Ament's claim. The camp was a place where Native Americans lived during the winter and spring on an annual basis. Prior to the attack, both Ament and Phillips were warned by Potawatomi chief Shabbona of impending danger to the settlers along Bureau Creek. The men had fled, with their families, leaving their goods and livestock behind. Eventually, it was decided that it was safe to return to the settlement to tend to the deserted possessions.

On the morning of either June 17 or June 18, the band of about 30 Native Americans returned to their hidden positions of the day before and awaited the settlers. When the settlers awoke Brigham and Phillips went onto the porch of Ament's cabin where they conversed for a few minutes, failing to notice the moccasin tracks around the property. Phillips decided to go to his cabin, about a half mile (.8 km) from Ament's property, to finish a letter to his parents. Brigham, intending to accompany Phillips, entered his cabin for a moment, when he did he heard the crack of a rifle outside. Phillips dropped to the ground, struck by two musket balls, and the band of raiding Native Americans immediately descended upon him with their tomahawks. Phillips was the only person killed or injured in the raid.

== Other incidents ==
Aside from these various attacks and murders there were a number of other small attacks and skirmishes throughout the duration of the Black Hawk War. In the one-week period following Stillman's Run and before the Indian Creek massacre, militia men were ambushed at Buffalo Grove, where one militia member was killed, and there was a short, bloodless battle at present-day Savanna along the Plum River. In June 1832 there were two attacks at Fort Blue Mounds in Michigan Territory that killed three militia men. A mid–June attack at Spafford Farm killed five people total. At the end of June, following the attack on Ament's Cabin and important battles at Waddams Grove and Horseshoe Bend, two militia members were killed at Sinsinawa Mound in present-day southern Wisconsin.

== Aftermath ==
Collectively, these attacks served to spread fear throughout the region, especially in northeastern Illinois around the area of the Indian Creek massacre where a wave of terror gripped the region. Into the lead mining region around Galena, Illinois anxiety spread as attacks occurred and news of the movements of the elusive Black Hawk poured in. After the death of Adam Payne no white settlers in the area really felt safe.

The various attacks in May, following Stillman's Run helped contribute to the region's growing fear as well as an exodus from the area near the incidents. In the case of the attack that killed Henry Apple, the result was a battle which helped sway the course of the militia's morale and public confidence in the force. The attack at Ament's Cabin led to a small chase of the attackers but nothing came of it and the remains of Elijah Phillips were returned to Hennepin, Illinois for burial.
