= Battle of Horseshoe Bend (1832) =

- Part of the Black Hawk War
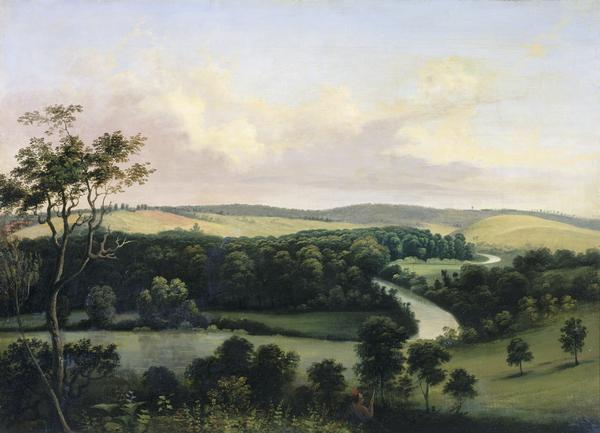
- An 1857 painting of the battlefield at Horseshoe Bend.
Date	June 16, 1832
Location	Near present-day Woodford, Wisconsin 42°39′41″N 89°52′36″W
Result	United States victory

Belligerents
United States	Kickapoo; loosely affiliated with Black Hawk's British Band

Commanders and leaders
Henry Dodge	

Strength
30	11

Casualties and losses
3 KIA; 1 WIA	11 KIA

- Pecatonica Battlefield
- U.S. National Register of Historic Places
- Location within Wisconsin Location within the United States
- Location: 2995 County Road Y
- Nearest city: Woodford, Wisconsin
- Coordinates: 42°39′40″N 89°52′40″W
- NRHP reference No.: 11000488
- Added to NRHP: July 28, 2011

The Battle of Horseshoe Bend, also referred to as the Battle of Pecatonica and the Battle of Bloody Lake, was fought on June 16, 1832, in present-day Wisconsin at an oxbow lake known as "Horseshoe Bend", which was formed by a change in course of the Pecatonica River. The battle was a major turning point in the Black Hawk War, despite being of only minor military significance. The small victory won by the U.S. militia at Horseshoe Bend helped restore public confidence in the volunteer force following an embarrassing defeat at Stillman's Run. The Battle of Horseshoe Bend ended with three militia men killed in action and a party of eleven Kickapoo warriors dead.

The militia men involved in the Battle of Horseshoe Bend proved their ability to obey orders, act as a disciplined unit, and show bravery. Unlike at Stillman's Run, the troops waited for Colonel Henry Dodge's commands before acting on the field of battle. When ordered to charge, the men obeyed and eventually won a fight that descended into a bloody hand-to-hand battle. A memorial marker was erected to commemorate the battle in 1922. Today the battleground at Horseshoe Bend is a county park.

== Background ==
As a consequence of an 1804 treaty between Governor William Henry Harrison of Indiana Territory and a group of Sauk and Fox leaders regarding land settlement, the Sauk and Fox tribes vacated their lands in Illinois and moved west of the Mississippi in 1828. However, Sauk Chief Black Hawk and others disputed the treaty, claiming that the full tribal councils had not been consulted, nor did those representing the tribes have authorization to cede lands. Angered by the loss of his birthplace, between 1830 and 1831 Black Hawk led a number of incursions across the Mississippi River, but was persuaded to return west each time without bloodshed. In April 1832, encouraged by promises of alliance with other tribes and the British, he again moved his so-called "British Band" of around 1000 warriors and non-combatants into Illinois. Finding no allies, he attempted to return to Iowa, but the undisciplined Illinois Militia force's actions led to the Battle of Stillman's Run. A number of other small skirmishes and massacres followed and the militias of Michigan Territory and Illinois were mobilized to hunt down Black Hawk's Band. The conflict became known as the Black Hawk War.

The period between Stillman's Run and Horseshoe Bend was filled with war-related activity. A series of attacks at Buffalo Grove, the Plum River settlement, Fort Blue Mounds and the war's most famous incident, the Indian Creek massacre, all took place between mid-May and late June 1832. In the week before the Battle of Horseshoe Bend, Colonel Henry Dodge of the western Michigan Territory militia was busy responding to various incidents across the region. On the afternoon of June 8, 1832, Dodge and his men, including James W. Stephenson, proceeded to Kellogg's Grove and buried the victims of the St. Vrain massacre. That night Stephenson returned to Galena, Illinois, while Dodge moved to Hickory Point where he remained overnight. The next morning Dodge set out for Dixon's Ferry, where he camped with General Hugh Brady.

== Prelude ==
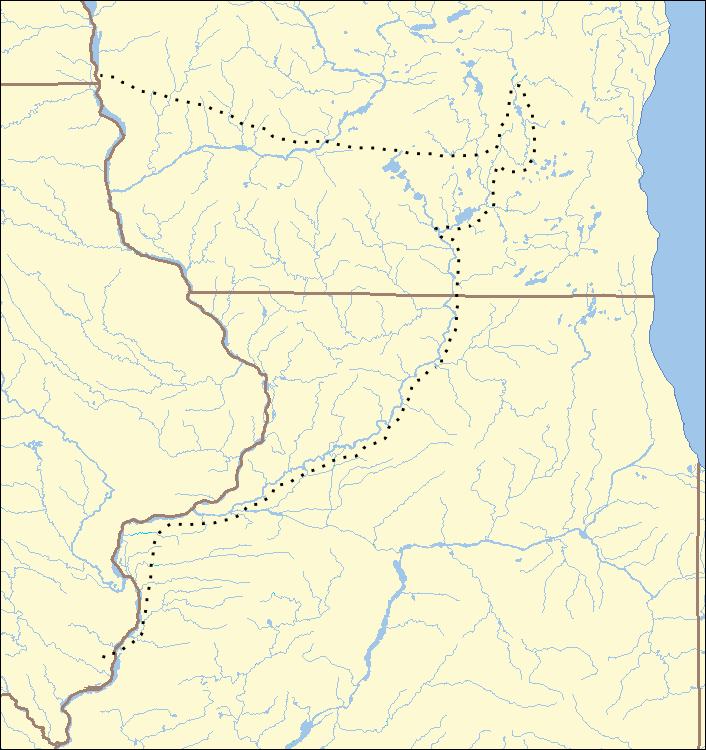
- Map of Black Hawk War sites Battle (with name) Fort / settlement Native village Symbols are wikilinked to article

On June 11, Dodge escorted Brady to the mouth of the Fox River to confer with overall commander General Henry Atkinson. Dodge left the conference with clear authority from Atkinson to deal with the violence in the mining region. He first traveled to his home fort, at Gratiot's Grove, which he reached on June 13. The Spafford Farm massacre occurred the following day, and Dodge set out for Fort Hamilton as soon as he heard about it, stopping at Fort Blue Mounds for supplies. On the way to Hamilton, the soldiers passed a German immigrant, Henry Apple, exchanged greetings and kept traveling. Shortly afterwards the soldiers heard gunshots in the distance; Apple had met with a Kickapoo ambush, likely meant for Dodge himself. Dodge was probably saved by his last minute decision to make a detour from the main route. Later Apple's horse galloped wildly back past the men, wounded and carrying a large amount of blood in its saddle. The horse continued all the way to Fort Hamilton, where it raised a furor among the inhabitants.

A Native American band from the Kickapoo tribe, eleven warriors in all, was responsible for the attack on Apple; the same band had killed five men at Spafford Farm on June 14. This band was only loosely affiliated with Black Hawk's British Band.

On hearing the ambush in the distance, Dodge hurried on toward Fort Hamilton (present-day Wiota, Wisconsin) where he gathered together a company of 29 mounted volunteers and sped off to intercept the attackers. He led the chase through tangled underbrush until, breaking into prairie, his force caught sight of the raiding party. The Kickapoo crossed the Pecatonica River within sight of the pursuing militia, and entered into an overgrown swamp. The militia followed across the swollen river and dismounted when they reached the swamp.

== Battle ==
According to personal accounts of the battle, after dismounting Dodge offered his men a chance to back out of the operation. No one opted out, and 21 men advanced with Dodge in an extended firing line, unsure of the enemy's location. The remaining eight soldiers were posted as guards on high grounds and near the horses. Unlike the disorganized and undisciplined troops at Stillman's Run, the volunteers at Horseshoe Bend adhered to military discipline; they waited for Dodge to give the order before they entered the thicket and swampland in search of their enemy, and once searching they awaited their commander's order to attack.

After the militia advanced about 200 yards (200 m), the Kickapoo suddenly let loose a loud yell from their hidden position on the bank of an oxbow lake along the river. The warriors fired a volley toward the advancing militia and three men, Samuel Black, Samuel Wells and Montaville Morris, were hit and went down. Dodge did not hesitate and ordered his men to charge; they obeyed and waited until they were within six feet of the Kickapoo before discharging their weapons. The fight, after the initial charge and volley, descended into a hand-to-hand struggle with tomahawks, bayonets, muskets and spears the weapons of choice. The fighting only lasted a few minutes: nine Kickapoo were killed on the spot and the other two were felled while fleeing across the lake. During the hand-to-hand combat a fourth member of the militia, Thomas Jenkins, was wounded. Though short, the Battle of Horseshoe Bend had a lasting impact and influence on the rest of the war.

== Aftermath ==
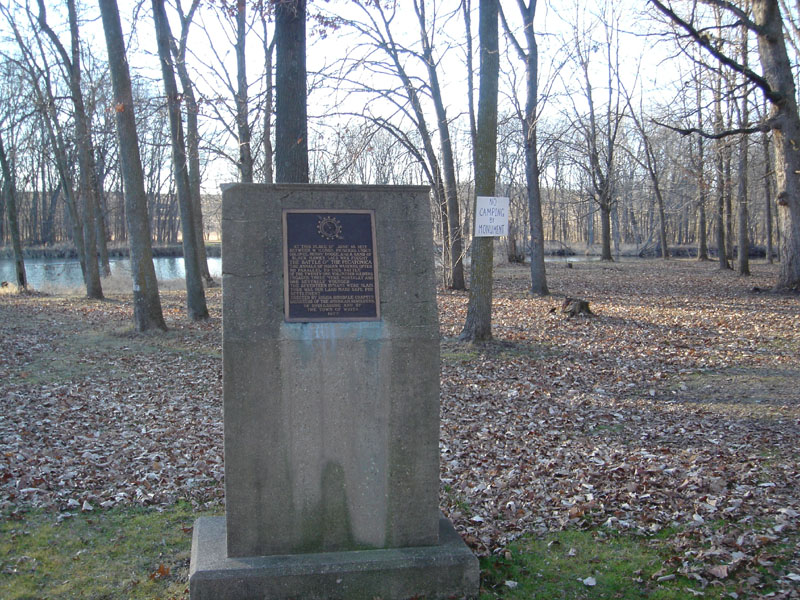
A historic marker was erected in 1922, in part, by residents of nearby Woodford, Wisconsin.

The Battle of Horseshoe Bend, though of little military significance, was a major turning point in the war for the volunteer militia forces and many white settlers. This minor militia victory was the first step in the process of redeeming the militia's own morale and its standing in the eyes of the settlers on the frontier. Individual accounts claim that the battle at Horseshoe Bend "turn(ed) the tide of the war." It was also notable for the proportion of killed in action to the number of combatants. All eleven Kickapoo that Dodge had pursued into the swamp were killed and scalped by his troops, while the final militia casualties were confined to three dead and one wounded. About an hour after the battle, Colonel William S. Hamilton arrived with friendly Menominee, Sioux and Ho-Chunk warriors. According to Dodge, the friendly warriors were given some of the scalps his men had taken, with which they were "delighted". Dodge also reported that the Native Americans then proceeded on to the battlefield and mutilated the corpses of the fallen Kickapoo.

Of Dodge's casualties, Thomas Jenkins was only slightly wounded. However, the three Militia men who had been shot as they advanced towards the Kickapoo position all later died. Samuel Wells, Montaville Morris and Samuel Black were transported to Fort Hamilton; Morris died at the fort, as did Wells, with his head in a comrade's lap. When informed by the surgeon of his imminent death, Wells requested to speak with Dodge. Wells asked Dodge "if he had behaved like a soldier." Dodge responded, "Yes, Wells, like a brave one." Wells then said to the commander, "Send that word to my old father," and died a short time later. Samuel Black was moved to Fort Defiance, where he lingered for nine days before dying.

This was the first battle in which a volunteer force defeated the Native Americans. Dodge became the first of the militia leaders to prove his ability to stand up to the enemy. He quickly became the "rising star" of the conflict, having helped negotiate the release of the Hall sisters after the Indian Creek massacre and proved himself at Horseshoe Bend.

The battlefield at Horseshoe Bend is now a campground located within a county park in Lafayette County, Wisconsin. The Black Hawk Memorial Park is maintained by the Lafayette County Sportsmen Alliance, Yellowstone Flint and Cap club, and the Friends of Woodford Park. In 1922, a marker was erected by the Shullsburg chapter of the Daughters of the American Revolution and the residents of Wiota to commemorate the Battle of Horseshoe Bend; it is still visible today. The battlefield was listed on the National Register of Historic Places by the National Park Service on July 28, 2011.
