= Alexander Posey (general) =

Alexander Posey (c. 1794-?) was an American militia officer who served as a brigadier general under General Henry Atkinson during the Black Hawk War, specifically in the later stages of the second campaign as one of the commanders present at the Battle of Bad Axe.

== Biography ==
Born in Orange County, Virginia to Revolutionary War General Thomas Posey and Mary Alexander, Alexander Posey was a physician in Gallatin County, Illinois when he was elected brigadier general by the volunteers gathered at Dixon's Ferry on June 13, 1832, possibly due to being the brother-in-law of U.S. Indian Agent Joseph Street. Assigned to command one of three brigades under General Henry Atkinson two days later, Posey was sent to Fort Hamilton accompanied by two companies of regulars under Hugh Brady on June 20.

On June 25, a detachment of soldiers from his command under Major John Dement were involved in a large skirmish with a Sauk war party under Neapope and Weesheet while encamped at Burr Oak Grove. Posey attempted to relieve Dement setting out from nearby Buffalo Grove, however the Sauk had retreated only two hours before his arrival. Five soldiers and twenty horses had been killed while nine Sauk were observed on the field. He briefly searched north for the raiding party then returned to Kellogg's Grove to await wait for the baggage-wagons before continuing on to Fort Hamilton where he made camp along the Pecatonica River on June 28.

Shortly after the Spafford Farm massacre, Dodge and Colonel William S. Hamilton arrived at Posey's encampment to take over Posey's command. Posey had previously received a letter from Atkinson on June 28 which stated "You will report and receive the orders of Genl. Dodge as practicable, who is an officer of great experience & merit & is aquatinted with the country." However, Posey refused to turn over his command to Dodge outright. Dodge agreed not to take his command by force and instead suggested they put the decision to the Illinois militiamen, with whom Dodge had considerable support. Of those most outspoken included Major Demet who had told his men "would lead them on to victory and retrieve the honor which a short time before they had lost in an Indian fight under Posey."

This statement accurately reflected the resentment against Posey for his refusal to use his main force against the raiding party which had attacked Demet's men. The Illinois Herald, a local Springfield newspaper, also campaigned for his removal in favor of Dodge citing cowardice and lack of aggressive leadership.

However, due in part to a personal appeal to his men as well as "a matter of state pride", Posey retained his command by a small majority. This caused some distention in the ranks as Demet reportedly tore up his commission, threw the shredded paper on the ground and spat on them, before resigning his command of his battalion.

Meeting up with Major Henry Dodge's battalion from Galena, Illinois, the two eventually rejoined General Atkinson, accompanied General Milton Alexander and General James D. Henry, at the White River or Whitewater on July 6. During the match, he and Dodge encountered White Crow and thirty Winnebagos. Offering to lead Posey and Dodge to Black Hawk's camp, they followed White Crow and his warriors through near impassable wilderness and swampland for several days. The party were reportedly only a short distance from Black Hawk's camp when they received a direct order from Atkinson to join him at his encampment on Bark River, part of eastern Lake Koshkonong.

As Atkinson's forces began to run low on provisions, Posey sent his 2nd Regiment under Colonel Ewing to accompany Alexander, Henry and Dodge to Fort Winnebago for supplies while he was sent back to Fort Hamilton to guard the mining country left exposed by Dodge's absence.

In late-July, Posey moved out from Fort Hamilton to join Atkinson's expedition at Fort Blue Mounds preparing for the final confrontation with Black Hawk's band at the Battle of Bad Axe where, during August 1–2, he and Alexander would command the ring flank in support of the main center force of regulars under Dodge.
