= Holderman =

Holderman is a surname. Notable people with the surname include:

- Colin Holderman (born 1995), American baseball player
- James B. Holderman (1936–2021), American academic and president of the University of South Carolina
- James F. Holderman (born 1946), United States federal judge
- Nelson M. Holderman (1885–1953), United States Army officer

== See also ==
- Holderman's Grove raid, occurred in Holderman's Grove, near Fox River (Illinois River tributary)
