= General Posey =

General Posey may refer to:

- Alexander Posey (general) (born c. 1794), Illinois Militia brigadier general
- Carnot Posey (1818–1863), Confederate States Army brigadier general
- Thomas Posey (1750–1818), Continental Army brigadier general
