= Yellow Creek (Illinois) =

River in Illinois, United States

Physical characteristics
- Source
  - location: Stephenson County, northwest of Lena, Illinois
  - coordinates: 42°25′10″N 89°53′52″W
  - elevation: 977 ft (298 m)
- Mouth
  - location: Pecatonica River, east of Freeport, Illinois
  - coordinates: 42°17′24″N 89°34′10″W
  - elevation: 748 ft (228 m)
- Length: 50 mi (80 km)

Basin features
- Progression: Yellow Creek → Pecatonica → Rock → Mississippi → Gulf of Mexico
- GNIS ID: 421568

Yellow Creek is a tributary of the Pecatonica River in Stephenson County, in the US state of Illinois. The 50-mile (80 km) stream also flows through a small part of Jo Daviess County. The waters of Yellow Creek were assessed for water quality in 1996, with 28 miles (45 km) being listed as "fair" and 22 miles (35 km) being listed as "good". During the 1832 Black Hawk War, the Battle of Waddams Grove was fought along Yellow Creek.

== Course ==
Yellow Creek is a 50-mile (80 km) tributary within the Pecatonica River watershed and is considered a major stream within that system. Most of its course is through Stephenson County, Illinois, but a small part of the stream flows into Jo Daviess County, in extreme northwestern Illinois. The stream's source is at 42°25′10″N 89°53′52″W and its mouth is at 42°17′23″N 89°34′10″W.

== History ==
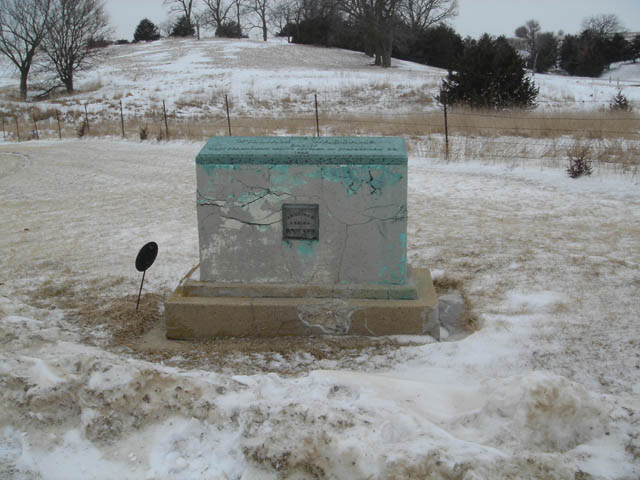
The hill in the background of this image of the site of William Waddams cabin at Waddams Grove is the likely battle site along the creek.

During the 1832 Black Hawk War, a conflict between Sauk Chief Black Hawk's British Band and settlers in Michigan Territory and the state of Illinois, the Battle of Waddams Grove occurred near Yellow Creek. After a number of Native American raids in the area, James W. Stephenson raised a group of volunteers and set out in search of the raiders. Stephenson caught up with the band of Native Americans on June 18, 1832, in an open area near Yellow Creek, about 12 miles (19 km) east of Kellogg's Grove, Illinois. The battlefield itself is believed to be located along the Yellow Creek northwest of William Waddams' original land claims north of the present day unincorporated town of Waddams Grove, Illinois.

== Water quality ==
A total of 22 miles (35 km) of the stream's waters were identified as "good" and 28 miles (45 km) were designated as "fair" by the Illinois Environmental Protection Agency in 1996. Water quality problems in Yellow Creek stem from nutrient run off as a byproduct of agriculture. In Freeport, Illinois the Yellow Creek Watershed Partnership was established "to improve the health and diversity of Yellow Creek and its watershed".
