= Spafford Farm massacre =

1832 attack on US militia and civilians

Coordinates: 42°34′30″N 89°55′44″W

Spafford Farm Massacre
- Part of the Black Hawk War
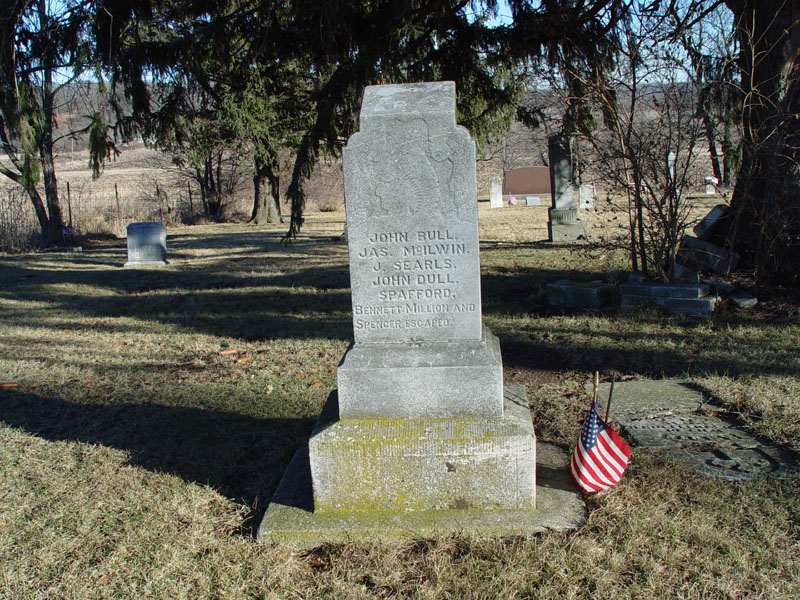
- Monument near South Wayne, Wisconsin.
Date	June 14, 1832; 194 years ago
Location	Near present day South Wayne, Wisconsin
Result	British Band victory

Belligerents
United States	Kickapoo; those aligned with Black Hawk's British Band

Strength
6	unknown

Casualties and losses
4 killed	1 killed

The Spafford Farm massacre, also referred to as the Wayne massacre, was an attack upon U.S. militia and civilians that occurred as part of the Black Hawk War near present-day South Wayne, Wisconsin. Spafford Farm was settled in 1830 by Omri Spafford and his partner Francis Spencer.

Before the war started they made numerous improvements to the parcel of land. On June 14, 1832 five men were attacked by a Kickapoo war party, three whites were killed instantly, including Spafford. In total at least one Native and four white settlers were killed in the action. Two men managed to escape. One mistakenly feared for days that Fort Hamilton had been captured, before finally seeking refuge there. The incident at Spafford Farm eventually led to the Battle of Horseshoe Bend (also known as the Battle of Pecatonica).

== Background ==
As a consequence of an 1804 treaty between the Governor of Indiana Territory and a group of Sauk and Fox leaders regarding land settlement, in 1828 the Sauk and Fox tribes vacated their lands in Illinois and moved west of the Mississippi River. However, Sauk Black Hawk and others disputed the treaty, claiming that the full tribal councils had not been consulted, nor did those representing the tribes have authorization to cede land. Angered by the loss of his birthplace, Black Hawk led a number of incursions across the Mississippi River beginning in 1830. Each time, he was persuaded without bloodshed to return west. In April 1832, encouraged by promises of alliance with other tribes and the British, he again moved his so-called "British Band" of around 1,000 warriors and civilians into Illinois. Finding no allies, he attempted to return to Iowa, but events overtook him and led to the Battle of Stillman's Run. A number of other engagements followed, and the state militias of Wisconsin and Illinois were mobilized to hunt down Black Hawk's band. The ensuing conflict became known as the Black Hawk War. On May 19, a group of militia volunteers were ambushed at Buffalo Grove and the same day as the raid at Plum River, May 21, a more famous war event, the Indian Creek massacre, occurred. The Indian Creek event, considered mostly a peripheral event to the Black Hawk War, was followed on by more violence preceding the attack at Spafford Farm.

== Prelude ==
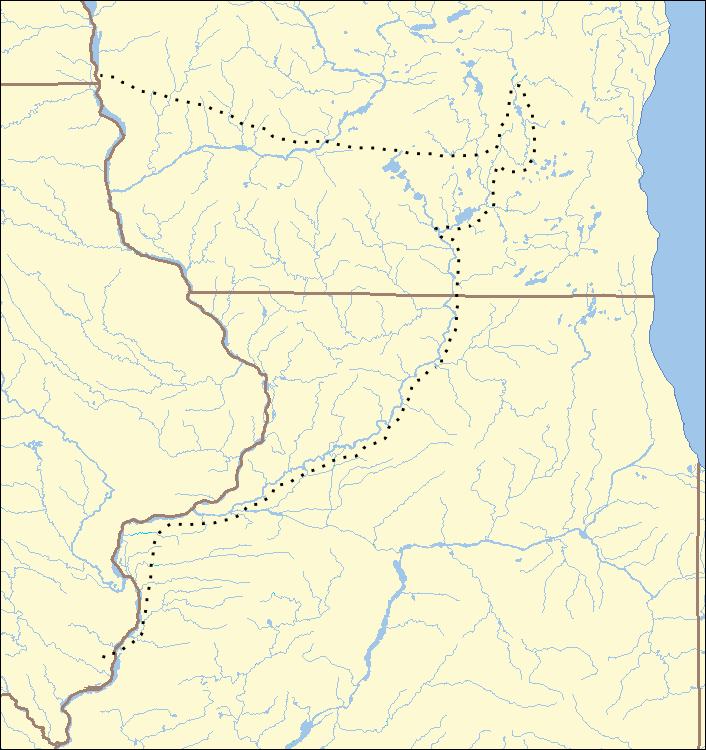
Map of Black Hawk War sites
Battle (with name) Fort / settlement Native village
Symbols are wikilinked to article

The Spafford Farm massacre, also known as the Wayne massacre, occurred in LaFayette County, Wisconsin, near present-day South Wayne, Wisconsin during the course of the Black Hawk War. The first land claim in Lafayette County was made in tandem by Omri Spafford and Francis Spencer in 1830. The location that become known as Spafford Farm, was located near the junction of the Spafford's Branch and the Pecatonica River. The pair made many improvements on the land prior to the onset of the war in 1832. Present at Spafford Farm the day of the massacre besides Spafford was Spencer, Bennett Million, Abraham Searles, James McIllwaine, and an Englishman identified only by the moniker "John Bull", but probably being John Compton.

== Massacre ==
On June 14, 1832 the six men were sent from Fort Hamilton to work on Spafford Farm. The group had just commenced working when they were attacked by a band of Kickapoo warriors. The warriors had concealed themselves in some trees near the farmstead and opened fire in a surprise attack. The men dropped their tools and broke for the Pecatonica River, reaching the river and making a hasty crossing. Having crossed the river, four of the men were shot as they clambered up the opposite bank.

Spafford, Searles and McIllwaine were killed instantly in the melee; also killed was "Bull" (probably John Compton). Spencer and 17-year-old Million were able to escape the attackers. Million escaped by jumping into the Pecatonica River, hiding in brush and making his way to Fort Hamilton. Spencer's escape was a longer process. He did not jump into the river, but hid along the banks. One of the attackers pursued him but Spencer killed the warrior before he could be overtaken. He wandered the woods for several days before reaching Fort Hamilton.

Spencer reached Fort Hamilton around the same time that Colonel William S. Hamilton arrived with a large group of Menominee who had volunteered against the Sauk and Fox. Afraid that the fort had also been attacked, Spencer retreated back into the woods. He avoided the fort for between six and nine days, when hunger finally drove him into the open where he realized his mistake.

== Aftermath ==
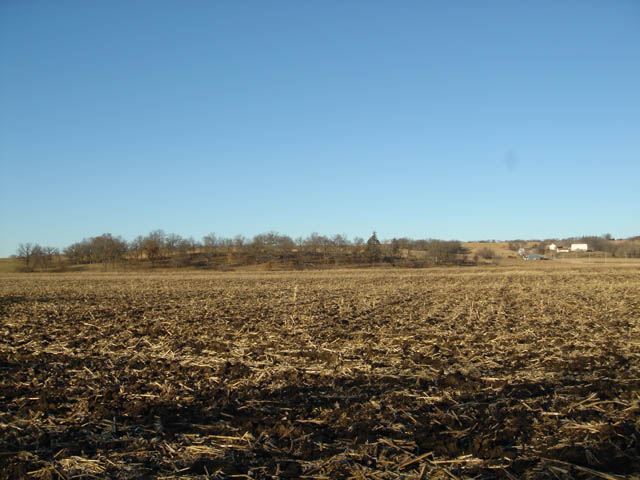
The massacre occurred in this area near the Pecatonica River.

Word of the attack at Spafford's farm spread quickly to Fort Defiance, about five miles southeast of Mineral Point. A small volunteer force of 13 men was assembled at Fort Defiance and they set off to hunt down the band of Native Americans responsible for the massacre. The group reached Fort Hamilton at around midnight on June 15. On the morning of June 15, survivor Bennett Million guided the militia volunteers back to the site of the massacre. One of the volunteers was Alexander Higgenbotham, a survivor of the St. Vrain massacre. The bodies of the dead were badly mutilated and Spafford's corpse was headless. His head was found scalped and tossed into the grass along the river bank. The volunteers buried the mangled bodies of the fallen and searched in vain for Spencer, whom they also assumed dead.

Colonel Henry Dodge was at Gratiot's Grove when the war descended upon Spafford Farm, having just sent his volunteers to their forts to resupply and recuperate. Shortly after he arrived back at his home fort, he received word of the Aubrey murder at Fort Blue Mounds and the incident at Spafford Farm. Dodge ordered militia detachments from Fort Defiance, Fort Jackson, and Fort Hamilton to the scene of the massacre.

After the massacre, General Henry Atkinson was informed that Dodge was to take over General Alexander Posey's brigade at Fort Hamilton. While Dodge was on his way to visit the brigade, he heard a rifle shot from a group of Native Americans. Dodge quickly returned to his command post and gathered as many men as he could to pursue the enemy. With Dodge in quick pursuit, a group of approximately 25 Native warriors criss-crossed the Pecatonica River until, finding flight hopeless, they prepared to make a stand at the Battle of Pecatonica.

== See also ==
- List of massacres in Wisconsin
