= Kent, Illinois =

Kent
- Unincorporated community
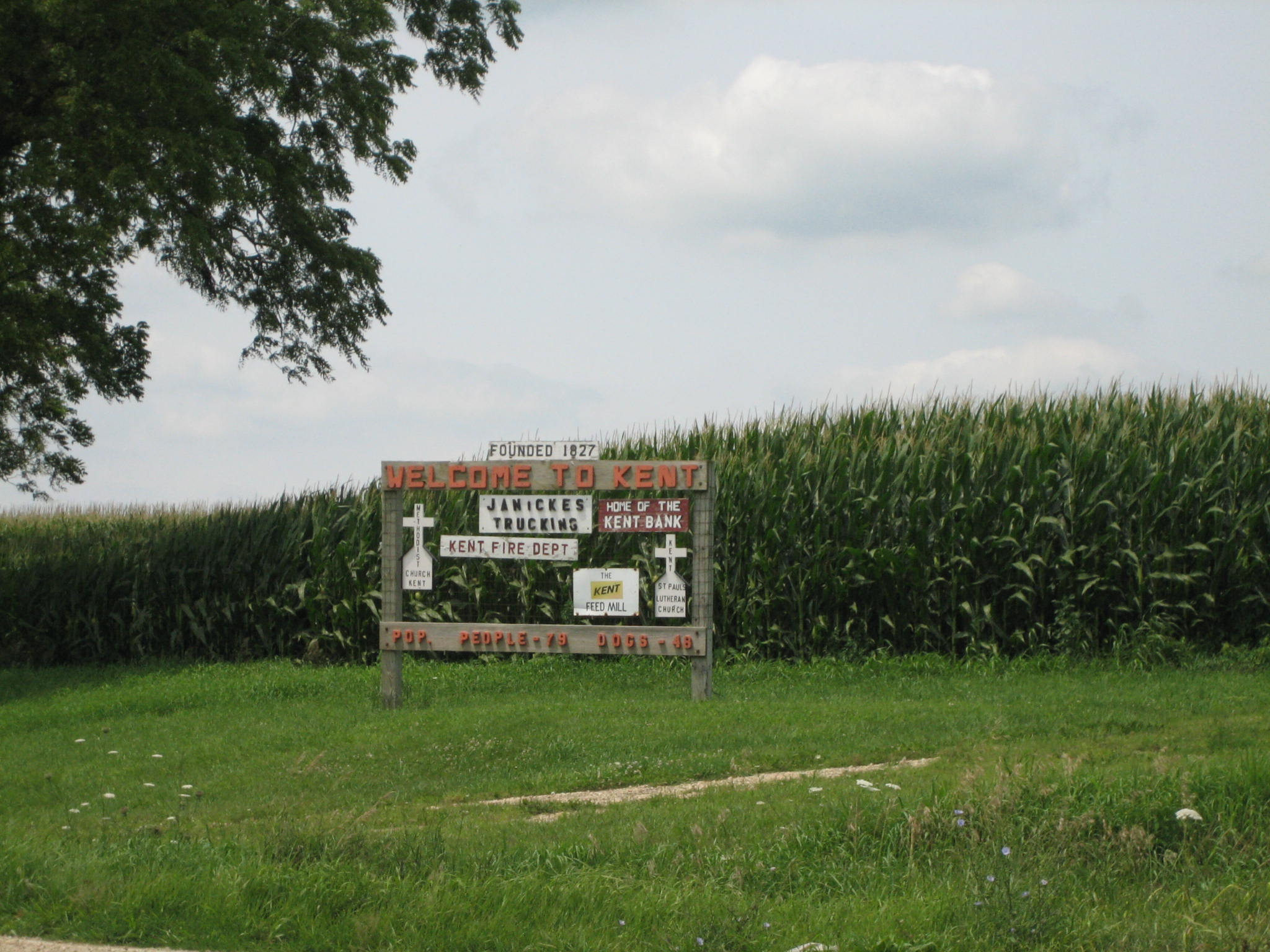
- Sign leading into Kent, Illinois, which notes the population of both people and dogs.

- Location of Kent within Illinois Kent (the United States)
- Coordinates: 42°18′31″N 89°54′07″W
- Country: United States
- State: Illinois
- County: Stephenson
- Township: Kent
- Established: 1827
- Elevation: 896 ft (273 m)

Population (2000)
  - Total: 79
- Time zone: UTC-6 (CST)
  - Summer (DST): UTC-5 (CDT)
- Zip code: 61044
- Area code: 815
- GNIS feature ID: 411409

Kent is an unincorporated community in Stephenson County, Illinois. Kent is home to Solutions Bank, K & M Feed Mill, St. Paul's Lutheran Church (ELCA), Nuestro Queso cheesemakers and Kent Fire Department.

== History ==
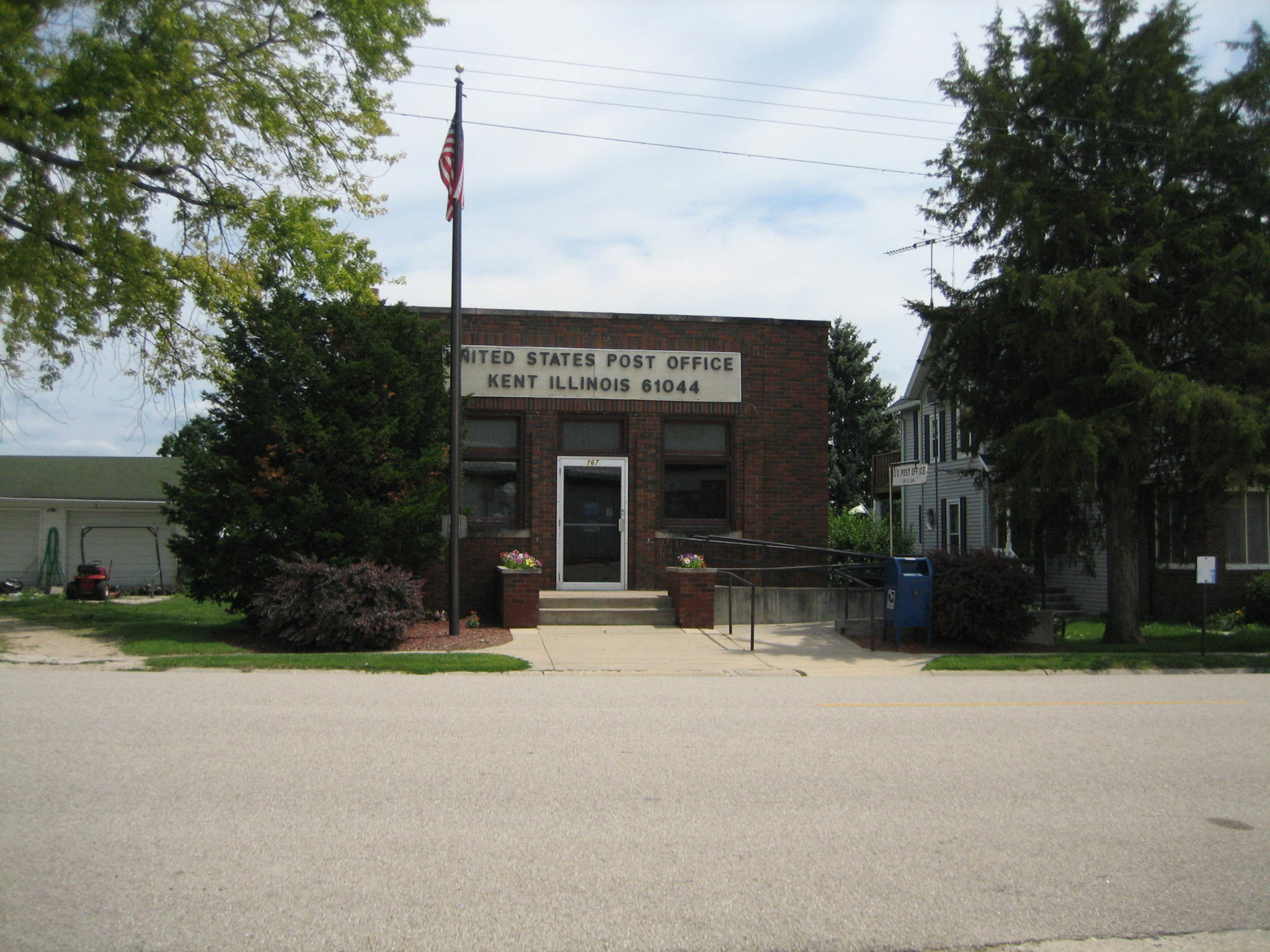
Post office in Kent

Kent was surveyed and platted in 1887 at the same time the Chicago Great Western Railroad laid its tracks through Stephenson County. When the village was founded it was the only village within its township and it was thought that the area had great potential for growth. Kent is probably named for the Reverend Aratus Kent, a traveling evangelist from Galena, Illinois. The post office in present-day Kent was established on July 29, 1850.

== Geography ==
Kent is located in Stephenson County, Illinois about 12 miles west of Freeport. Kent is located in the southwestern part of its township, near the Stephenson-Jo Daviess County line. It is also in proximity to Pearl City.

== Demographics ==
According to the 2000 Census, statistics which included the village of Kent and its surrounding zip code area, 274 people reside within the zip code 61044.

== See also ==
- Battle of Kellogg's Grove
- Black Hawk War
- Kellogg's Grove
