= Thomas Forsyth (Indian agent) =

Illinois frontiersman, trader and U.S. Indian Agent (1771–1833)

- Born: December 5, 1771; Detroit, Province of Quebec, British America
- Died: October 24, 1833 (aged 61); St. Louis, Missouri, United States
- Other name: Major Forsyth
- Occupations: frontierman, spy, army officer, Indian agent, trader
- Known for: Illinois frontiersman who served as U.S. Indian Agent to the Sauk and Meskwaki prior to the Black Hawk War
- Title: U.S. Indian agent to the Sauk and Meskwaki
- Term: 1818-1830
- Successor: Felix St. Vrain
- Spouse: Keziah Malotte (m. 1804–1833)
- Partner(s): John Kinzie, Robert Forsyth (son)
- Children: 4
- Parent: William Forsyth

Major Thomas Forsyth (December 5, 1771 – October 29, 1833) was a 19th-century American frontiersman and trader who served as a U.S. Indian agent to the Sauk and Meskwaki during the 1820s and was replaced by Felix St. Vrain, prior to the Black Hawk War. His writings, both prior to and while an Indian agent, provided an invaluable source of the early Native American history in the Northwest Territory. His son, Robert Forsyth, was a colonel in the United States Army and an early settler of Chicago, Illinois.

== Early life and family ==
Thomas Forsyth was born in Detroit, Province of Quebec, British America to William Forsyth, a Scots-Irish Presbyterian who immigrated from Ireland around 1750. A veteran of the French and Indian War, his father was twice wounded, while fighting under General Wolfe at the capture of Quebec City in 1759. The elder Forsyth had married the widow of another trader, so he was raised alongside his half-brother John Kinzie, with whom he would also later work. When Thomas Forsyth was a child, his father was imprisoned as a loyalist during the American Revolutionary War. Thomas Forsyth became a successful Indian trader in his youth, spending several years living with the Odawa on Saginaw Bay. As early as 1798, he spent the winter on an island in the Mississippi River a short distance downstream from present-day Quincy, Illinois.

== Indian trader, spy, and United States Indian agent ==
Thomas Forsyth later became partners with his half-brother, John Kinzie, and his son, Robert Forsyth. The two established a trading post in 1802 at the site of what is present-day Chicago, Illinois. After marrying Keziah Malotte near Malden in 1804, Forsyth moved to Peoria Lake, where he became a successful trader and businessman. During the Peoria War, he served as a spy for Governor William Clark and was later an agent for the tribes in the region and was able to persuade the Illinois River Potawatomi to remain neutral during the War of 1812. In December of that year, he and a number of others at the agency were arrested by the Illinois Rangers under Captain Thomas E. Craig, who later ordered Peoria to be burned. Forsyth was bitterly resentful of Craig's actions, but Craig defended himself by claiming neither he nor anyone else outside of Washington, D.C. knew of his status as an Indian agent. "It was supposed by the President that Mr. Forsyth would be more serviceable, to both sides, if his friends, the Indians, did not know this situation."

Thomas Forsyth and the others were eventually released by Craig, who dropped them off on the riverbank below Alton, Illinois, where they were "in a starving condition (and) they were landed in the woods ... without shelter or food." He would later distinguish himself as a supporter of peace for both Native Americans and the U.S. government and, often risking his own life, negotiated with tribal leaders for the release of American prisoners. This was most evident in his securing the release of the survivors of the Fort Dearborn massacre, among whom was Lenai T. Helm, the husband of his niece.

Officially appointed a U.S. Indian subagent for the Sauk and Meskwaki at Rock Island, Illinois, he was later stationed at Fort Armstrong and reported the movements of the Sauk and Meskwaki as well as its ever-increasing strength in the region during the early 1820s. He became a respected figure in the region. He was replaced after 18 years of service by Felix St. Vrain due to Forsyth's insubordinate attitude, unwillingness to remain at the fort, and the criticism of his supervisor. It has been speculated by historian Lyman Copeland Draper that his removal from the position as Indian agent to the Sauk and Meskwaki could have prevented the Black Hawk War.

== Death ==
Forsyth retired to St. Louis, Missouri where he died on October 29, 1833. He was survived by his wife, who died only four years later, and his four children.
