= Battle of Waddams Grove =

Battle part of the Black Hawk War

Coordinates: 42°25′42″N 89°51′21″W

- Part of the Black Hawk War
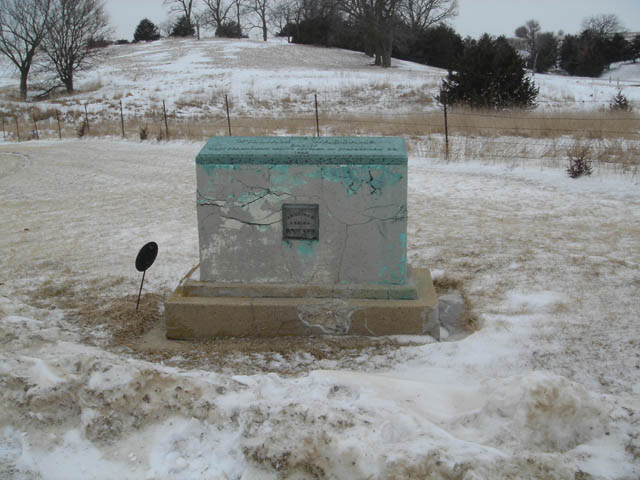
- Battle took place over hill in background, the marker locates site of William Waddams' cabin, the first permanent white settler in Stephenson County, 1832.
Date	June 18, 1832
Location	Near Waddams Grove, Illinois
Result	minor American victory

Belligerents
United States	Sauk

Commanders and leaders
James W. Stephenson	

Strength
12+	unknown

Casualties and losses
3 KIA	2-6 KIA

The Battle of Waddams Grove, also known as the Battle of Yellow Creek, was part of the Black Hawk War. It took place in present-day Stephenson County, Illinois on June 18, 1832. After several incidents of Sauk Indian raids on settlers along the Apple River, Captain James W. Stephenson left Galena with a group of volunteer militia in pursuit of the Native party. The group clashed on June 18, 1832 near Yellow Creek and the ensuing battle descended into a bayonet and knife fight in which several Sauk and three militia men were killed. Stephenson was severely wounded by a musketball to the chest during the fighting. The dead were eventually interred in a memorial cemetery in Kellogg's Grove, Illinois where a stone monument was erected in memory of those killed during the war.

== Background ==
Angered by the loss of his birthplace, in prior disputed treaties, Black Hawk led a number of incursions across the Mississippi River beginning in 1830. Each time, he was persuaded to return west without bloodshed. In April 1832, encouraged by promises of alliances with other tribes and the British, he again moved his "British Band," of around 1,000 warriors and civilians, into Illinois. Finding no allies, he attempted to return to Iowa, but ensuing events led to the Battle of Stillman's Run. A number of other engagements followed, and the state militias of Wisconsin and Illinois were mobilized to hunt down Black Hawk's band. The conflict became known as the Black Hawk War.

Following the first confrontation of the war Stillman's Run, the exaggerated claim that 2,000 "bloodthirsty warriors were sweeping all northern Illinois with the bosom of destruction" sent shock waves of terror through the region. Several small massacres and skirmishes ensued and until the Battle of Horseshoe Bend, fought two days before the clash at Waddams Grove, public confidence in the militia was low.

== Prelude ==
On June 9, 1832, between two attacks that occurred at Fort Blue Mounds, a party of Native Americans crossed over from the west side of the Mississippi River near Galena. The group continued up the Apple River, looting and stealing horses along the way, including an incident about ¾ of the way up the Apple River in which about a dozen horses were stolen from a small stockade. The Sauk raiding parties were mostly stealing food and supplies for Black Hawk's band of 1,000 men, women and children which were camped in the marshes of southwestern Wisconsin. A similar incident a few days later, though without injury or death, prompted a reaction from the white militia in the area.

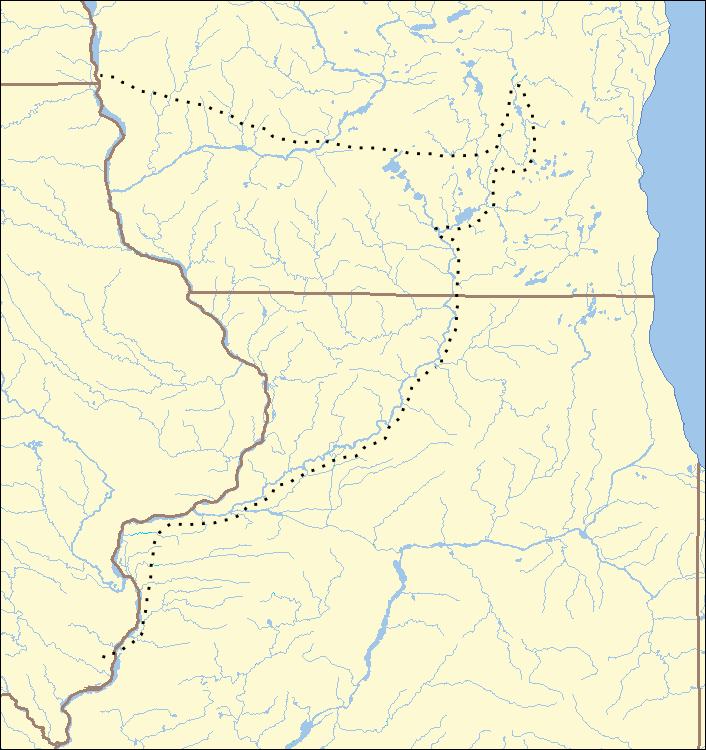
Map of Black Hawk War sites
Battle (with name) Fort / settlement Native village
Symbols are wikilinked to article

Rising anxiety levels in the white settlers caused Captain James W. Stephenson to gather 12 volunteers and move toward the area of the disturbances from Galena. Stephenson recruited more men at Apple River Fort and then traveled eastward. Stephenson and his men rose before dawn on June 18 and started following the trail of the band of Sauk who had stolen the horses. The militia marched through pounding rain before they finally caught up with the Sauk.

== Battle ==
Stephenson caught up with the band of Native Americans on June 18, 1832 in an open area near Yellow Creek, about 12 miles (19 km) east of Kellogg's Grove, Illinois. Initially, the militia could not get a clear shot at the Sauk as they rushed for cover in a wooded area near the creek. The militia men observed from what was likely to be West Point Hill.

Shots rang out from Stephenson's men but the Sauk did not immediately return fire and the fight eventually descended into a bayonet and knife battle. The militia charged into the thicket and the Sauk returned fire, killing Stephen P. Howard. The militia force made two more charges into the woods. During one of these, Thomas Sublette stabbed a Sauk in the neck and George Eames was killed in action. The third charge resulted in severe wounds for Stephenson, who was shot in the chest with a musketball, and the death of militia man Michael Lovell. According to Stephenson's account of the battle, five or six Native American warriors were killed and the militia lost three men.

The Sauk forces outnumbered Stephenson's militiamen and the group was forced to withdraw and retreat. When they left they took with them most of the horses that the Sauk had stolen in their journey up the Apple River.

== Aftermath ==
Although it allowed the militia men to draw Native American blood in revenge, the result of the battle was inconclusive with respect to its original purpose of stopping the Native American raids in the area. The men of the militia returned triumphantly to Galena, Illinois bearing the scalps of two Sauk warriors they had slain. The battle helped raise public opinion towards the militia. After the disastrous defeat at Stillman's Run in May, the battle at Yellow Creek coupled with the Battle of Horseshoe Bend, helped to demonstrate that the militia could stand up to and defeat Black Hawk's warriors.

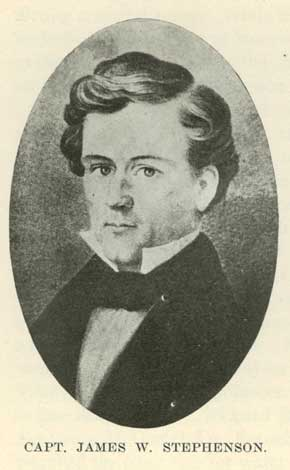
Captain James W. Stephenson's detachment caught up with the Sauk raiders on June 18, 1832. Stephenson was severely wounded in the encounter.

The militiamen killed in the Battle of Waddams Grove were eventually interred in a memorial cemetery in Kellogg's Grove. The graves are located beneath a large stone monument dedicated to those militia men killed during the Black Hawk War. The battlefield itself is believed to be located along the Yellow Creek northwest of William Waddams' original land claims north of the present day unincorporated town of Waddams Grove, Illinois.

== See also ==
- List of battles fought in Illinois
