= West Point Township, Illinois =

West Point Township
- Township
- Location in Stephenson County
- Coordinates: 42°25′02″N 89°52′10″W
- Country: United States
- State: Illinois
- County: Stephenson

Government
  - Supervisor: John Murrell

Area
  - Total: 35.76 sq mi (92.6 km^{2})
  - Land: 35.7 sq mi (92 km^{2})
  - Water: 0.07 sq mi (0.18 km^{2}) 0.2%
- Elevation: 1,086 ft (331 m)

Population (2010)
  - Estimate (2016): 3,236
  - Density: 94.4/sq mi (36.4/km^{2})
- Time zone: UTC-6 (CST)
  - Summer (DST): UTC-5 (CDT)
- FIPS code: 17-177-80788

West Point Township is located in Stephenson County, Illinois, United States. As of the 2010 census, its population was 3,369 and it contained 1,483 housing units. The village of Lena, the unincorporated community of Waddams Grove, and two former communities of Louisa and West Point were all located in this township.

== Geography ==
West Point is Township 28 North, Range 5 (part) and 6 (part) East of the Fourth Principal Meridian.

According to the 2010 census, the township has a total area of 35.76 square miles (92.6 km^{2}), of which 35.7 square miles (92 km^{2}) (or 99.83%) is land and 0.07 square miles (0.18 km^{2}) (or 0.2%) is water.

=== Stagecoach inns ===
The Buckhorn Inn, a log building, was built in 1838 in Alida, now Lena, along the Old State Road number 2, now called the Stagecoach Trail. It was a stop for the Frink, Walker & Company stage line that operated from Chicago to Galena 1839–1854. The building was demolished and replaced by Dodd's Inn in 1848.

Dodd's Inn was built by Samuel Dodds on the Buckhorn Inn site in 1848 as a stage inn for Frink, Walker & Company. From 1854 to 1857 the stone building was used as a post office. It is now a residence on Lena Street in Lena.

The Thomas S. French home and stagecoach stop (Section 19) was built after 1837 along the Old State Road number 2, now called the Stagecoach Trail. The stone house was a stop for the Frink, Walker & Company stage line. The stone stage barn across the road from the house was later demolished. The house is southeast of Waddams Grove and northwest of Five Corners intersection.

== Demographics ==
Historical population
| Census | Pop. | Note | %± |
|---|---|---|---|
| 2016 (est.) | 3,236 |
U.S. Decennial Census
