= Felix St. Vrain =

American United States Indian agent (1799–1832)

- Born: Felix August Antoine Saint-Vrain; March 23, 1799; St. Louis, Spanish Upper Louisiana Territory, present-day St. Louis, Missouri
- Died: May 24, 1832 (aged 33); Stephenson County, Illinois, near present-day Pearl City, Stephenson County, Illinois
- Cause of death: gunshot wound in Indian attack
- Resting place: Kellogg's Grove Cemetery, Kellogg's Grove, Stephenson County, Illinois
- Occupations: saw mill owner, sawyer, Indian agent
- Employer: U.S. Government
- Spouse: Marie Pauline Gregoire
- Parent(s): Jacques Marcellin Ceran de Hault de Lassus Saint-Vrain and Marie Félicité Dubreuil Saint-Vrain
- Relatives: Ceran St. Vrain (brother), Savinien St. Vrain (brother), Marcellin St. Vrain (brother) Charles Emmanuel St. Vrain (brother), Domitille St Vrain (brother), Emma de Hault Vrain (sister)

Felix St. Vrain, born Felix August Antoine St. Vrain (March 23, 1799 – May 24, 1832), was an American United States Indian agent who was killed by Native Americans during the Black Hawk War. St. Vrain died along with three companions while on a mission to deliver dispatches from Dixon's Ferry to Fort Armstrong, both in Illinois. The incident has become known as the St. Vrain massacre.

He was the brother of Ceran St. Vrain, a St. Louis fur trader who was the partner of the Bent Brothers. Together they established Bent's Fort, the only privately held fort in the west. It is located at what is now La Junta, Otero County, Colorado.

== Early life ==
Felix St. Vrain was born in St. Louis, Missouri, a son of Jacques DeHault Delassus de Saint-Vrain, a French aristocrat, who had immigrated to escape the violence of the French Revolution. His mother was an ethnic French woman from St. Louis.

St. Vrain married Marie Pauline Grégoire in 1822, and eight years later settled in Kaskaskia, Illinois, a former French colonial city in the 18th century. Operating a sawmill in Kaskaskia, St. Vrain was 31 years old when he was appointed to replace Thomas Forsyth as a US Indian agent.

== U.S. Indian agent ==
St. Vrain started working for the United States government as an Indian Agent in 1830. He was assigned to the Sauk and Meskwaki nations around Rock Island, Illinois during William Clark's tenure as superintendent of the St. Louis Indian Agency. St. Vrain was appointed while Forsyth continued to criticize William Clark's administration. St. Vrain had almost no experience dealing with Indians but, as a member of a politically important St. Louis-French family, he had connections to U.S. Senator Elias Kent Kane. Kane was a close acquaintance of William Clark and recommended St. Vrain for the appointment.

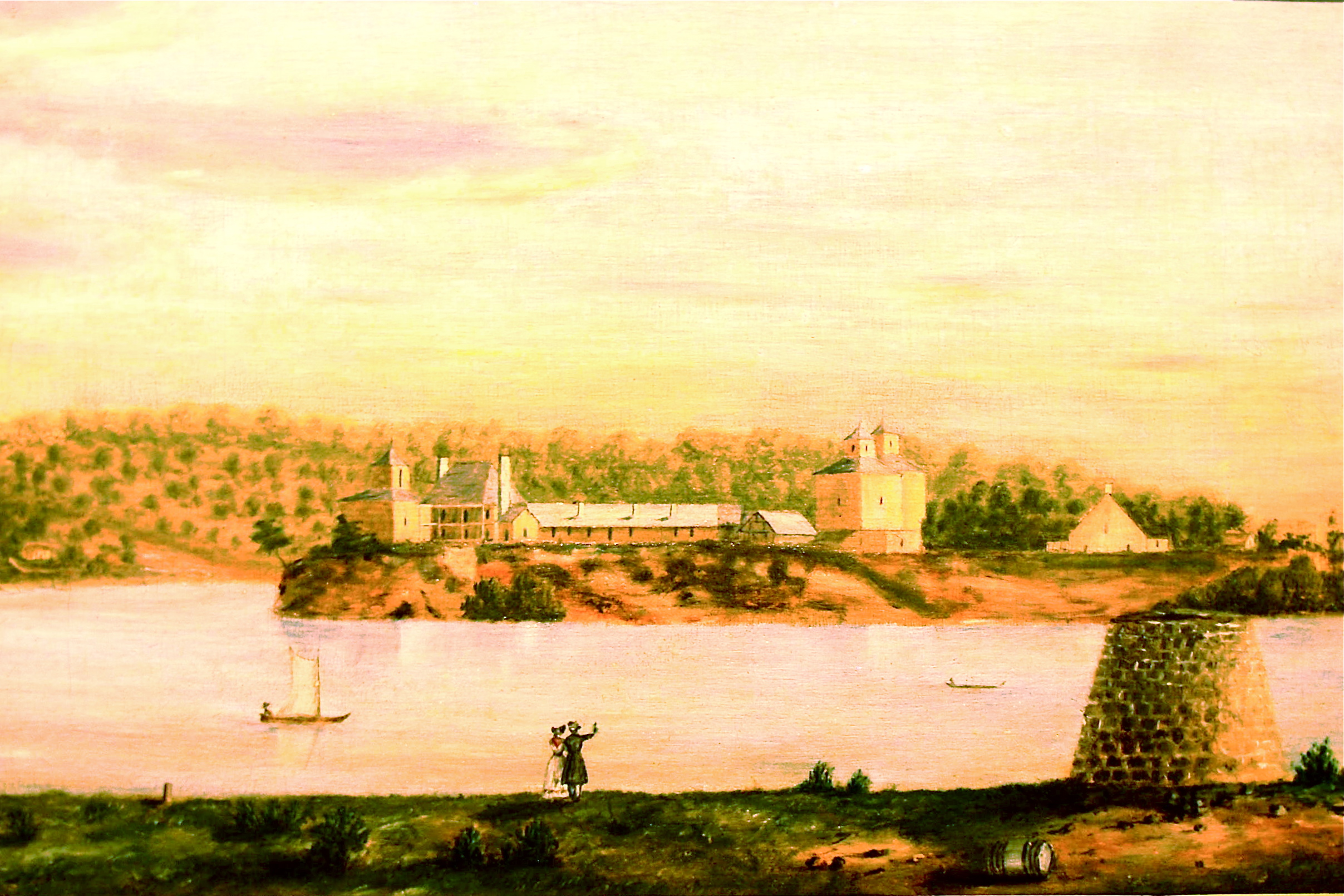
1839 painting of Fort Armstrong, six years after the removal of the Sauk and Meskwaki tribes, on the island, looking toward Iowa, in the background, from the Illinois side, of the Mississippi River, attributed to Octave Blair.

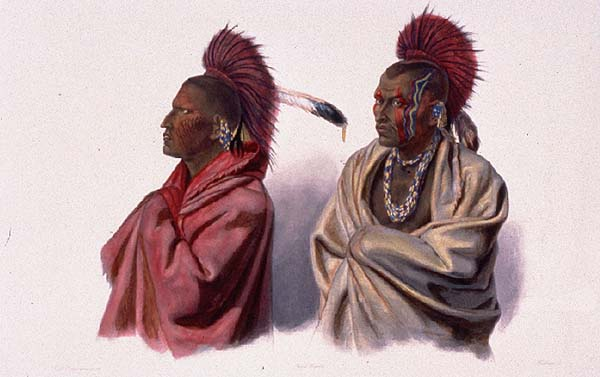
Sauk and Meskwaki men, in 1832, seen at their Indian village, of Saukenuk, monitored by Felix St. Vrain, the U.S. Indian Agent, assigned to these two tribes, from the U.S. Army post of Fort Armstrong. The former territory of the Sauk and Meskwaki village, is now a part of the present-day city of Rock Island

== Black Hawk War and St. Vrain Massacre ==
When the Black Hawk War began, St. Vrain was stationed at Fort Armstrong. The story circulated upon his death by Governor John Reynolds was that St. Vrain was keenly in tune with Indian culture and was treacherously murdered by a chief who had adopted him as a brother, even naming him Little Bear. This story is almost certainly not true.

While on a mission to deliver dispatches, from Dixon's Ferry, present-day Dixon, Illinois to Galena, under the command of General Henry Atkinson, Felix St. Vrain was killed, along with three other members of his party, on May 24, 1832. This incident was later known by Americans as the "St. Vrain Massacre". The St. Vrain party were most likely attacked by a band of pro-Sauk Ho-Chunk warriors, though sources disagree over the attackers' tribe.

St. Vrain and the other victims were buried by a detachment of soldiers under Colonel Henry Dodge. One account of the massacre, from Gen. George Wallace Jones (St. Vrain's brother-in-law and the man who identified his body), claimed the attackers scalped all of the dead men, and cut off the hands, head and feet of St. Vrain. They removed his heart, which they ate as part of their post-battle ritual to take on power of the enemy. The four men were buried in Kellogg's Grove. In 1834 (either January 6 or March 24) the U.S. Congress passed a bill to provided financial aid to St. Vrain's family. They made a 640-acre land grant to his wife in the state of Missouri.

== See also ==
- Kellogg's Grove
- Warrior (steamboat)
