= Hugh Brady (general) =

American general (1768–1851)

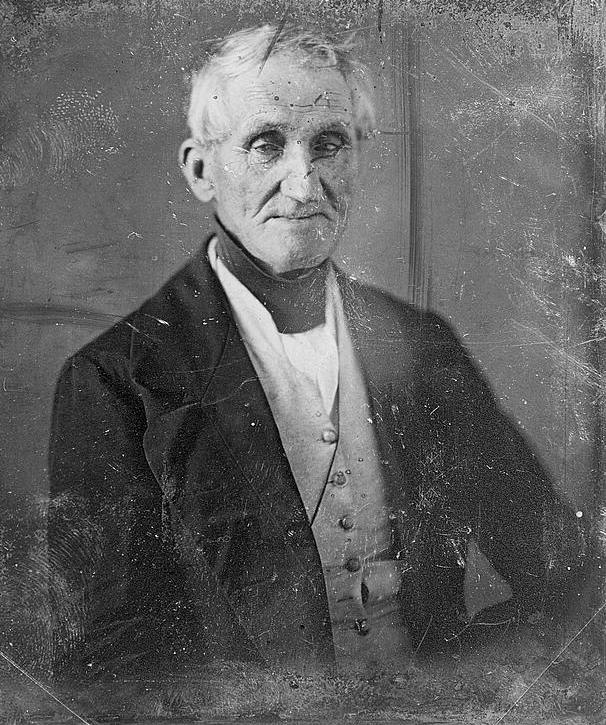
- Brady, between 1844 and 1851
- Born: July 29, 1768; Huntingdon, Pennsylvania, U.S.
- Died: April 15, 1851 (aged 82); Detroit, Michigan
- Relatives: Samuel Brady (brother)
- Military career
- Allegiance: United States
- Branch: United States Army
- Service years: 1792–1795; 1799–1800; 1812–1851
- Rank: Colonel; Brevet Major General
- Commands: 2nd Infantry Regiment
- Conflicts: Northwest Indian War; War of 1812; Black Hawk War

Hugh Brady (July 29, 1768 – April 15, 1851) was an American general from Pennsylvania. He served in the Northwest Indian War under General Anthony Wayne, and during the War of 1812. Following the War of 1812, Brady remained in the military, eventually rising to the rank of major general and taking command of the garrison at Detroit. He also marginally participated in the 1832 Black Hawk War. Hugh Brady died an accidental death in 1851 when he was thrown from a horse-drawn carriage.

== Early life ==
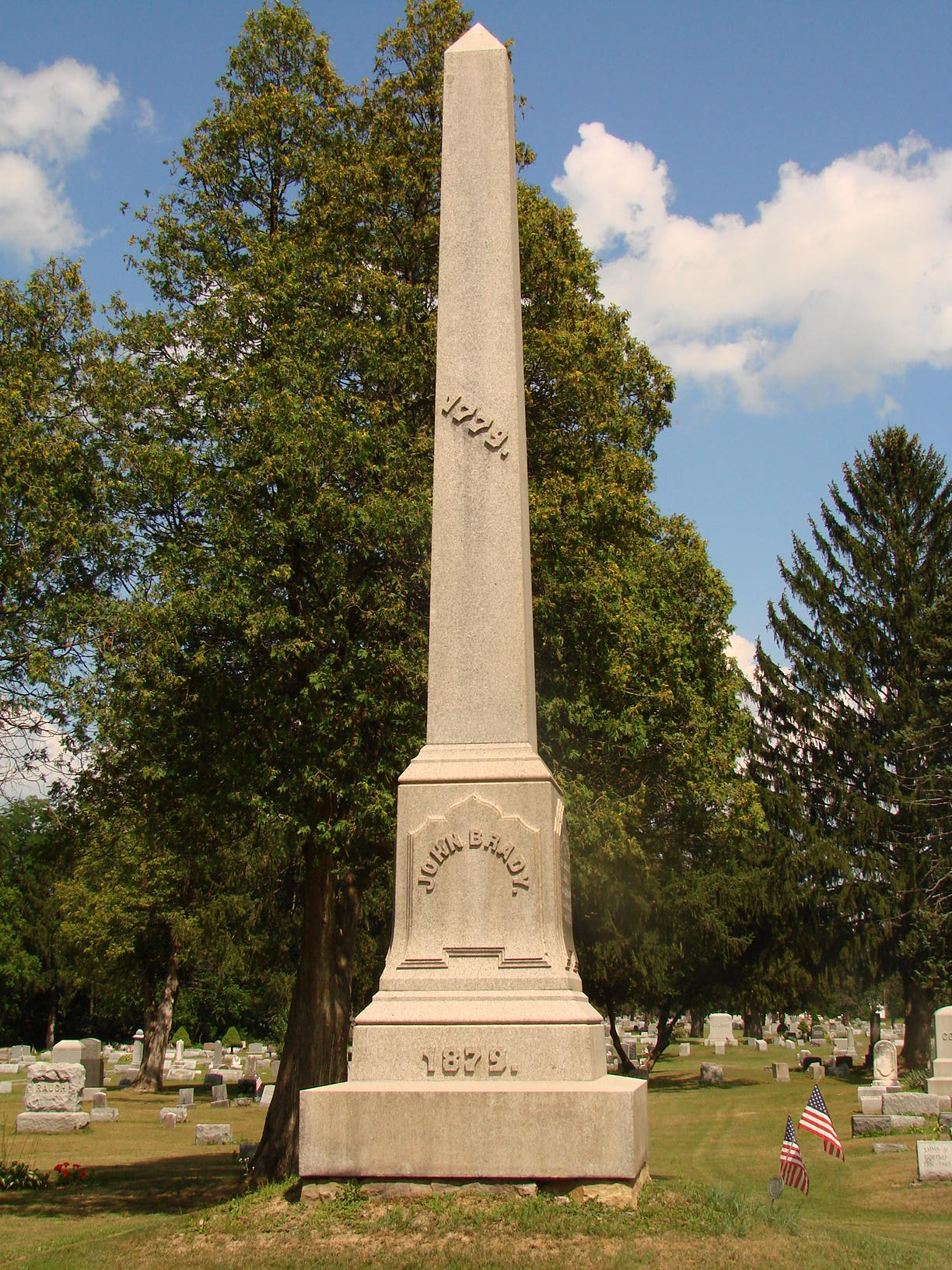
Monument to John Brady, Muncy, Pennsylvania

Hugh Brady was born July 29, 1768, one of six sons and four daughters by John and Mary Brady, in Standing Stone, Huntingdon County, Pennsylvania. Brady's father, Captain John Brady, was killed in 1779, during the American Revolution in a battle with Native Americans. In May 1779, the family moved to Brady's maternal grandfather's home in Cumberland County and stayed there until October 1779. After a harsh winter, Brady spent the ensuing few years working the fields in the area with his brothers, often armed in case of conflict with Native Americans. Brady's mother died in 1783, and his oldest siblings began to marry. Hugh Brady moved with his brother Samuel Brady to Washington County, Pennsylvania. Samuel married and Hugh stayed with his brother until 1792, when he began his military career.

=== The Brady and Quigley families ===
Hugh's father, Capt. John Brady, was born in 1733 near Newark, Delaware and died April 11, 1779, near Muncy, Pennsylvania in an Indian attack. His mother was Mary Quigley Brady, who was born on August 16, 1735, in Hopewell Township, Cumberland County, Pennsylvania and died October 20, 1783, in Muncy, Lycoming County, Pennsylvania. Capt. John Brady and Mary Quigley Brady had thirteen children, three of whom died in infancy. Their children were Captain Samuel Brady, born 1756; James Brady, born 1758; William Brady, born 1760 and died in infancy; John Brady, born March 18, 1761; Mary Brady (Gray), born April 22, 1764; William Penn Brady, born August 16, 1766; General Hugh Brady, twin, born July 27, 1768; Jane Brady, twin, born July 27, 1768; Robert Quigley Brady, born September 12, 1770; Agnes Brady, born February 14, 1773, and died November 24, 1773; Hannah Brady (Gray), born December 3, 1774; Joseph Brady, born in August 1777 and died in infancy; and Liberty Brady (Dewart), born August 9, 1778.

=== The Quigleys ===
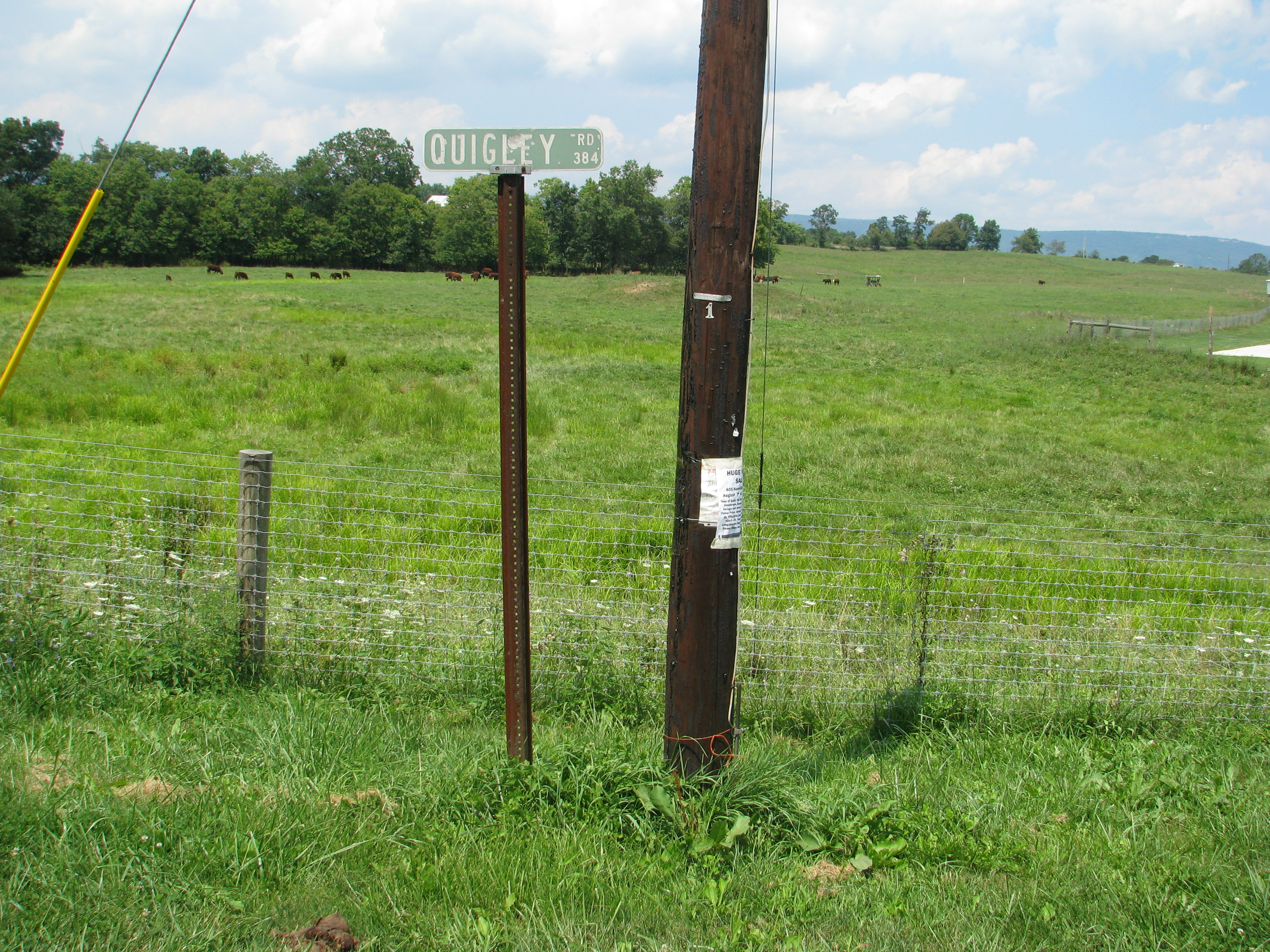
Quigley Road, Cumberland Co., Pa., runs past former Quigley house and crossed former Quigley Bridge

Hugh's Irish maternal grandfather, James Quigley, was born in about 1710 and came to America from Ireland in 1730. He settled on 400 acres (1.6 km^{2}) of frontier land, in what is today, Hopewell township, Cumberland County, Pennsylvania, close to present day Shippensburg, Pennsylvania. He built his wilderness home of logs close to the banks of Conodoguinet Creek.

The Irish were the earliest settlers on the Pennsylvania frontier of the early 18th century. As one author puts it.

The Cumberland Valley was dotted with Irish settlements throughout its entire area, a district which had become almost exclusively the possession of this racial group, with whom were mingled small numbers of English and German settlers constituting perhaps ten percent of the population. It was well adapted to farming, and the Irish, in this early period, were mostly farmers, but later they developed a marked aptitude for trade and the professions. As pioneers, they were the advance guard blazing the trail through the wilderness far out on the frontier. They were the first line of defense against the savages, bearing the brunt of the Indian wars, and courageously enduring the hardships of pioneer life as the typical frontiersmen of provincial Pennsylvania. Step by step they had advanced along a perilous path, surmounting whatever difficulties arose, moving ever farther into the wilderness and reclaiming it to the new civilization.

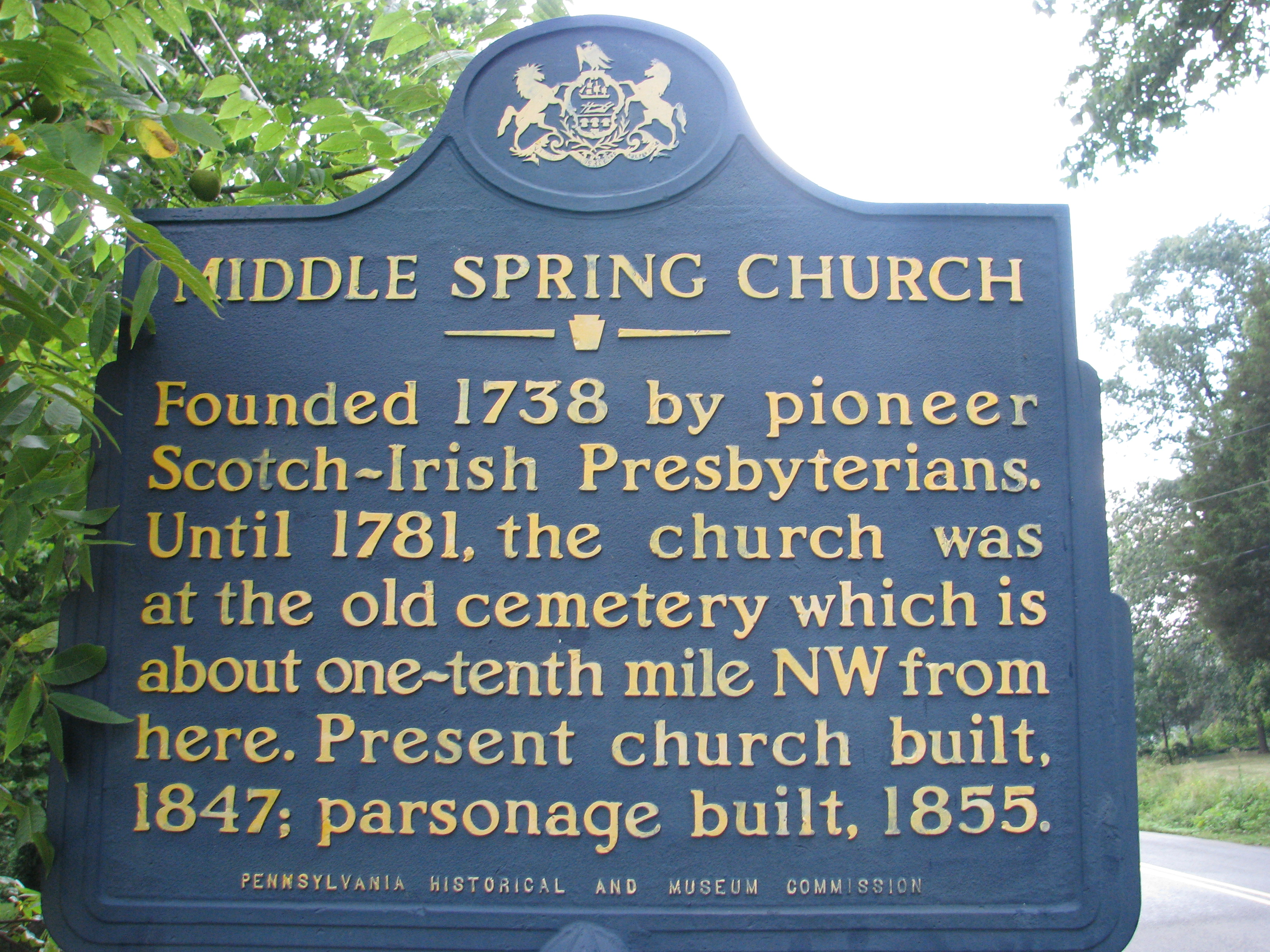
Plaque at Middle Spring Pennsylvania Presbyterian Church

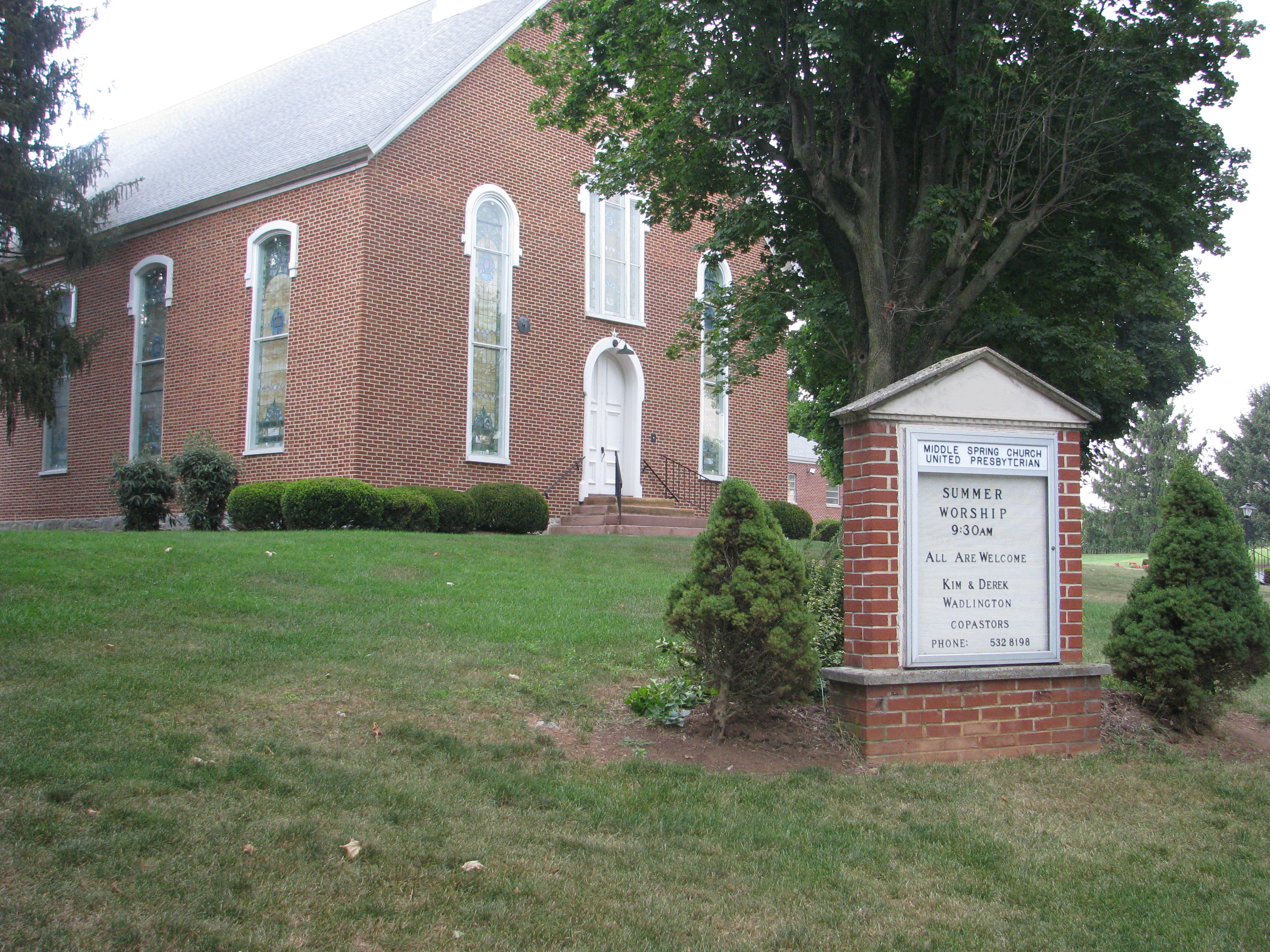
Rebuilt Middle Spring Pennsylvania Presbyterian Church

Little is known of James' wife, Jeanette, except that she was likely of Scottish descent and probably was born in Hopewell Township in 1725. However, according to Brady family historian, Belle Swope, "We are assured she was a devoted wife, a loving mother, and a wise counselor, or she would not have given to the world such brave and illustrious children." In 1738 the log Middle Spring Presbyterian Church was erected three miles (5 km) from their homestead, of which James and Jeanette Quigley became faithful members and in which they along with some of their children came to be buried in its old graveyard. James Quigley had to be and was ever vigilant to keep hostile Indians from killing his family and burning his home–a fate that befell many of his neighbors in those early days on the Pennsylvania frontier. In addition to successfully keeping his home and family safe, on March 25, 1756, James Quigley was commissioned ensign in the Cumberland County Colonial Rangers. He served as a private in the Revolutionary War. He died in 1782. They had six children, who were all born on their Hopewell Township homestead, namely, John Quigley, born in August 1731, Samuel Quigley, born in June 1733, Mary Quigley (who was the wife of Major John Brady, Hugh's mother), born August 16, 1735, Agnes Quigley, born in March 1737 or 1738, Martha Quigley, born in July 1741 and Robert Quigley, born in 1744, who married Mary Jacob. Robert Quigley eventually ended up living on the Quigley Homestead, at Quigley Bridge, Hopewell Township, Cumberland County, Pennsylvania. Robert Quigley and Mary Quigley Brady remained very close throughout their lives.

=== The Bradys ===
As to the Brady grandparents of General Hugh Brady, Belle Swope states, "No family of pioneers was more conspicuous in the early history and settlement of the country than the Bradys." Hugh Brady was born in 1709 in County Cork, Ireland. Hannah's maiden name was McCormick. She was born on January 3, 1709, in Dublin, Ireland. After immigrating from Ireland, the Bradys first lived in the American colony of Delaware where they were married in 1733. They are said to have moved to frontier Pennsylvania on the urging of prosperous friends who told them that good land was readily available. Hugh and Hannah Brady moved to the Scottish-Irish Presbyterian community on the banks of Conodoguinet creek around 1733, where they established a homestead close to where the Quigleys had already settled. They thereby became near neighbors of and fellow church members with James and Jeanette Quigley. They had nine children, Major John Brady (General Hugh Brady's father), born in 1733 in Delaware, Samuel T. Brady, born in 1734, Joseph Brady, born in 1735, Hugh Brady, born in 1738, William Robert Brady, born in 1740 in Cumberland County, Pennsylvania, Margaret Brady, born in 1742, Mary Brady, born in 1745, Ebenezer Brady, born in 1750 and James Brady, born in 1753. All of their children, except Major John Brady, were likely born in Hopewell Township, Cumberland County, Pennsylvania. Hannah Brady died in 1776 in Cumberland County, Pennsylvania. Hugh Brady died on May 26, 1787, also in Cumberland County, Pennsylvania. As are the Quigleys, they are also buried in the Middle Spring Presbyterian Church Cemetery, Cumberland County, Pennsylvania.

== Military career ==
=== Early career ===
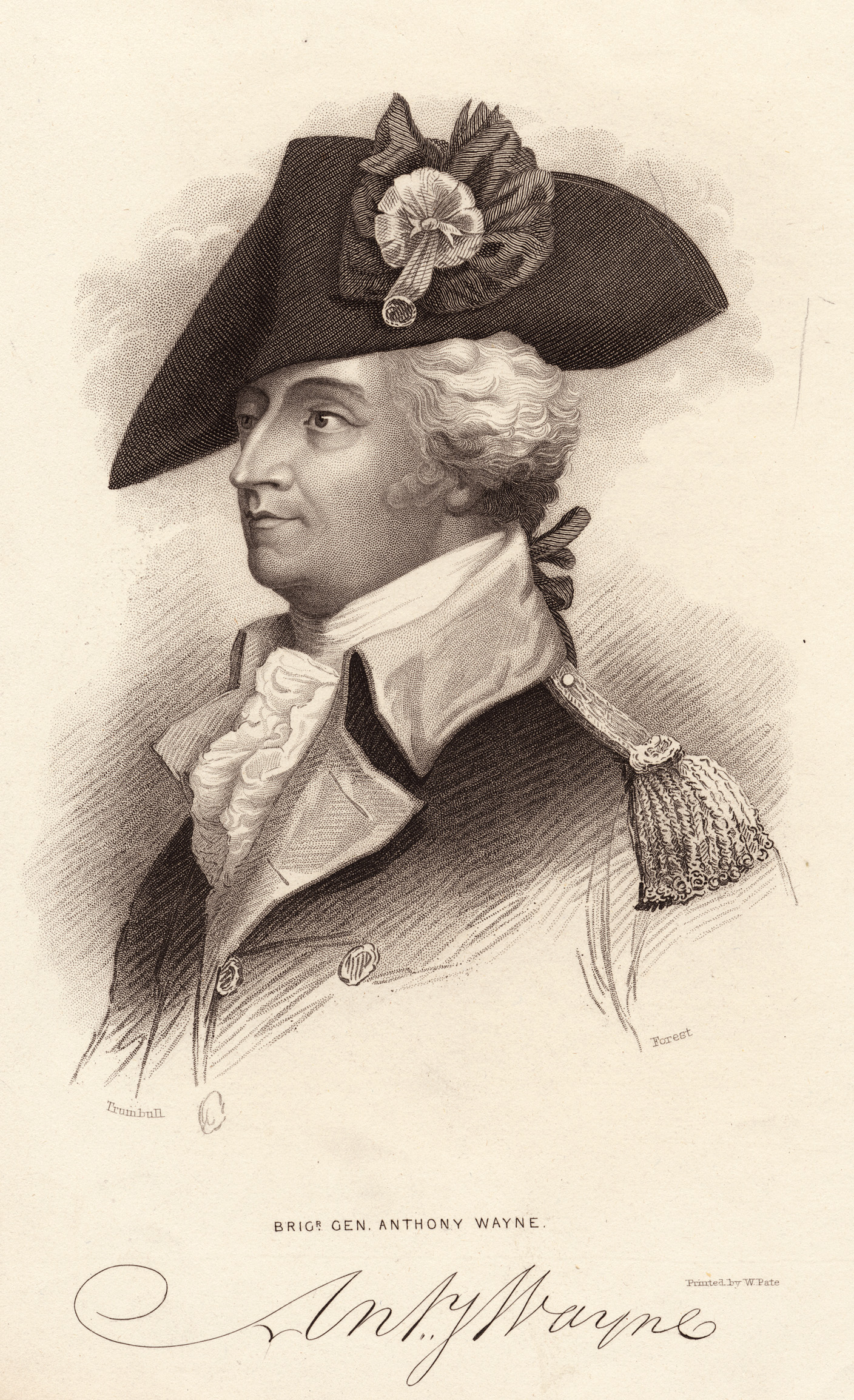
General Anthony Wayne

Brady was first inducted into the military with a commission from George Washington as an ensign in General "Mad" Anthony Wayne's Legion of the United States in March 1792 and placed in a rifle company under the command of Captain John Crawford. By 1794, Brady rose to the rank of lieutenant, and fought with Wayne in the Northwest Indian War. Brady participated in the decisive Battle of Fallen Timbers, which resulted in the Treaty of Greenville. In October 1795 he left the military, albeit temporarily, and returned to Virginia to visit the widow of his brother, Captain Samuel Brady.

His brother had settled in Ohio County, Virginia and after visiting his widow there, Hugh Brady decided to return home to see his family in Sunbury, Pennsylvania. He arrived there, after further stops in Virginia and Kentucky, in 1797. He remained in Sunbury until, during the winter of 1798–99, he was appointed a captain in the army raised by the administration of President John Adams during the Quasi-War. This army was disbanded a year later, and Brady went about improving a plot of land, with his brother William, about 50 miles (80 km) from Pittsburgh along the Mahoning River. Brady married Sarah Wallis and remained on the plot until 1807.

=== War of 1812 ===
In 1807 Brady moved to Northumberland County, Pennsylvania and remained there until 1812. In July 1812 he received a commission as colonel from President James Madison and once again rejoined the ranks of U.S. military officers. He was given command of the 22nd Infantry Regiment and saw action at the Battle of Chippawa and the Battle of Lundy's Lane, where he was severely wounded. The wounds ended his service during the War of 1812. Brady would remain in the military after the war, until his death in 1851.

=== In Michigan ===
In 1815 Brady was appointed Colonel Commandant to the 2nd Infantry Regiment based at Sackett's Harbor, New York. In 1822, Colonel Brady and five companies of the 2nd Infantry established Fort Brady on the site of the French stockade Fort Repentigny (1751), along the St. Mary's River at Sault Sainte Marie, Michigan Territory, near Lake Superior. The outpost became an important defense structure in the upper Michigan frontier. In 1822, most of the soldiers at Fort Brady were withdrawn and transferred to Fort Snelling, Minnesota. Brady rose in rank to brevet brigadier general later that same year, after ten years service. Brady had command of the garrison at Detroit by 1828.

=== Black Hawk War ===
In late April 1832 the Black Hawk War began between Sauk war chief Black Hawk's British Band and the Illinois state and Michigan Territorial Militia. Brady left Michigan Territorial Capital for Fort Winnebago, near present-day Portage, Wisconsin. Brady was Commandant of the Department of the Upper Great Lakes at the time and was accompanied by one aide. Brady, having seen combat in the 1790s with Wayne and during the War of 1812, was of the opinion that the Sauk could be easily defeated with only a few companies of soldiers. Brady was given command of two companies and set out to rendezvous with General Henry Atkinson, overall commander, in northern Illinois.

Much of Brady's overall involvement in this conflict was peripheral. On the afternoon of June 8, 1832, Henry Dodge and his men, including James W. Stephenson, proceeded to Kellogg's Grove and buried the victims of the St. Vrain massacre. That night Stephenson returned to Galena, Illinois, while Dodge moved to Hickory Point where he remained overnight. The next morning Dodge set out for Dixon's Ferry, where he camped with General Brady. On June 11, Dodge escorted Brady to the mouth of the Fox River to confer with Atkinson. Dodge left the conference with clear authority from Atkinson to deal with the violence in the mining region. Hugh Brady set out for Fort Hamilton, with the brigade commanded by Alexander Posey and his two companies of regulars, on June 20. Brady was eventually given a larger force but was stricken with dysentery in July and did not participate further in the war.

Maj. General Hugh Brady, before 1851

== Late life and death ==
Five years after the Black Hawk War, in 1837, Brady was given command of Military Department No. 7, headquartered in Detroit. He remained in the position for seven years, during which time he was in command over the removal of several Native American tribes as well as an incident known as the "Patriot War". When the U.S.-Mexican War broke out, Brady was too old to join the troops in the field but he assisted by helping to raise troops and equipment and shipping it to the war zone. In 1848, three years before his death, Brady was brevetted to the rank of major general.

Hugh Brady died, an accidental death, in Detroit on April 15, 1851. Brady was at the helm of a horse-drawn carriage, when the vehicle became entangled in telegraph wires. The wires, lowered for repairs, caused the horses to panic. In the panic, Brady was thrown from the carriage and fatally injured. He died in the presence of his pastor, Dr. (Rev.) George Duffield.
