= William S. Hamilton =

Son of Alexander Hamilton, American politician and miner (1797–1850)

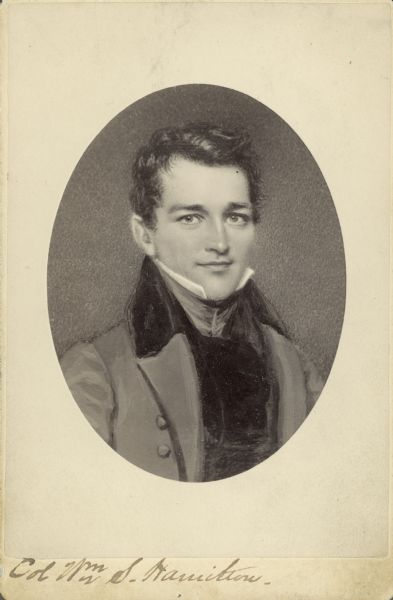

Representative to the Legislative Assembly of the Wisconsin Territory from Iowa County
- In office December 5, 1842 – December 4, 1843 Serving with Robert M. Long and Moses Meeker
- Preceded by: Thomas Jenkins, David Newland, Ephraim F. Ogden, and Daniel M. Parkison
- Succeeded by: George Messersmith, Robert M. Long, and Moses Meeker

Member of the Illinois House of Representatives from the Sangamon County district
- In office November 15, 1824 – December 4, 1826
- Preceded by: Stephen Stillman
- Succeeded by: Elijah Iles

Personal details
- Born: William Stephen Hamilton; August 4, 1797 Albany, New York, U.S.
- Died: October 9, 1850 (aged 53) Sacramento, California, U.S.
- Cause of death: Cholera
- Resting place: Sacramento City Cemetery, Sacramento, California
- Parents: Alexander Hamilton (father); Elizabeth Schuyler (mother)

Military service
- Allegiance: United States
- Branch/service: Illinois Militia
- Years of service: 1827, 1832
- Rank: Colonel
- Commands: Galena Mounted Volunteers, various U.S. aligned indigenous bands
- Battles/wars: Winnebago War, Black Hawk War

William Stephen Hamilton (August 4, 1797 – October 9, 1850), a son of Alexander Hamilton and Elizabeth Schuyler Hamilton, was an American politician and miner who lived much of his life in the U.S. state of Illinois and the Wisconsin Territory. Hamilton was born in New York, where he attended the United States Military Academy before he resigned and moved to Illinois in 1817. In Illinois, he lived in Springfield and Peoria and eventually migrated to the lead-mining region of southern Wisconsin and established Hamilton's Diggings at present-day Wiota, Wisconsin. Hamilton served in various political offices and as a commander in two Midwest Indian Wars. In 1849, he moved to California during the California Gold Rush. He died in Sacramento, most likely of cholera, in October 1850.

== Early life ==
William Stephen Hamilton was born August 4, 1797, in Albany, New York, sixth child and fifth son of Alexander Hamilton and Elizabeth Schuyler. His maternal grandparents were General Philip Schuyler and Catherine Van Rensselaer.

William was a month shy of his seventh birthday in 1804 when his father was killed in a duel with Vice President Aaron Burr. In 1814, he was admitted to the United States Military Academy, resigning three years later in 1817. Following his resignation from West Point, Hamilton moved to Sangamon County, Illinois. He lived in Springfield and Peoria, Illinois, until 1827 when he moved to the lead mining region around the Fever River.

== Career ==
=== Political and militia service ===
Hamilton first held elected office in 1824 as a member of the Illinois House of Representatives from Sangamon County in 1824. While working in the legislature Hamilton sponsored a bill that imposed a statewide tax intended to fund road repair and maintenance. The tax was proportional to property value, to be paid in labor or money, and replaced an older system which required every able-bodied man to work on the roads five days per year. The bill passed, and the new law was met with much opposition; it was repealed by the next legislature in 1826–27. Hamilton served as aide de camp to Governor Edward Coles, and while living in Illinois, first in Springfield and later in Peoria, Hamilton worked for the United States General Land Office as Deputy Surveyor of Public Lands. In that position he surveyed Springfield's township. He was also an incorporator of the original Illinois and Michigan Canal Company, along with Coles and other prominent Illinoisans.

In late 1827, Hamilton served during the Winnebago War in the volunteer Illinois Militia as a captain. Hamilton commanded a company raised in Galena, Illinois, known as the Galena Mounted Volunteers. Hamilton's company was under the command of Henry Dodge and was mustered into service on August 26, 1827, and released on September 10, 1827. Hamilton moved to Wisconsin and established Hamilton's Diggings in 1827.

During the April–August 1832 Black Hawk War, between white settlers in the lead mining regions and Sauk Chief Black Hawk's British Band, Hamilton again served in the volunteer militia. Accounts of the war indicated that Hamilton was often in charge of the militia's indigenous allies. At the war's onset it was known that many of the Sioux and Menominee were eager to join the conflict against the Sauk. Hamilton was sent to the Michigan Territory, north of Prairie du Chien, to recruit the assistance of indigenous allies. The result was successful and several parties of U.S. aligned Native Americans joined the war.

In June, Hamilton's return to Fort Hamilton with a large group of militia-aligned Native Americans coincided with the arrival of one of the survivors of the June 14 Spafford Farm massacre. The survivor, Francis Spencer, arrived at the fort around the same time as Hamilton did - accompanied by U.S. aligned Menominee. Afraid that the fort, like his party at the farm, had also been attacked, Spencer retreated back into the woods. He avoided the fort for between six and nine days, when hunger finally drove him into the open and he realized his mistake. On June 16, about an hour after the fight at Horseshoe Bend, Hamilton arrived on the battlefield with U.S. aligned Menominee, Sioux and Ho-Chunk warriors. According to Dodge, the warriors were given some of the scalps his men had taken, with which they were "delighted". Dodge also reported that the allied warriors then proceeded onto the battlefield and mutilated the corpses of the fallen Kickapoo.

=== Wisconsin Territory politics ===
Hamilton (a Whig) was elected as a member of the 7th Michigan Territorial Council (the "Rump Council" for what was to become the Wisconsin Territory) from Iowa County, and served as President for that body's only meeting in 1836. He served in 1842 and 1843 as an elected member of the Wisconsin Territorial House of Representatives, from Iowa County. Hamilton lost an 1843 election for the national-level office of Wisconsin Territory delegate to the United States Congress, and in 1847 he lost an election for delegate to the Wisconsin Constitutional Convention to John O'Connor. Though well known as a smelter and miner in the lead region of southern Wisconsin and northern Illinois, Hamilton, a Whig in a heavily Democratic region, was unable to achieve the political fame he desired.

=== Mining career ===
When Hamilton moved from Illinois to Wisconsin in the late 1820s he established a lead ore mine that became known as Hamilton's Diggings; he later renamed the settlement Wiota. During the 1832 Black Hawk War a fort was erected at Hamilton's Diggings, it was known as Fort Hamilton. Two contemporary descriptions of Hamilton's Diggings provide a glimpse into the mining life of Hamilton and the others settled at present-day Wiota. An 1831 account from Juliette Kinzie noted the unkempt conditions as "shabby" and "unpromising". Kinzie also decried the foul language from the miners, whom she called the "roughest-looking set of men I ever beheld." The other description of early Wiota was provided by Theodore Rodolf in 1834. Rodolf, a one-time political opponent of Hamilton, contrasted the settlement's apparently rough exterior with small, finer details, such as the presence of a quarto edition of Voltaire's works, printed in Paris.

His mother visited Hamilton at Hamilton's Diggings during the winter of 1837–38. During the same period, Hamilton briefly owned the Mineral Point Miners' Free Press; he sold it to a group from Galena and the paper became known as the Galena Democrat.

When gold was discovered in California, in 1848, gold fever spread into the Midwest lead-mining region. Hamilton set out for California, arriving in 1849, with high hopes, and new equipment. His life in the west would prove to be a disappointment and he later regretted moving there. Hamilton told a friend in California that he would "rather have been hung in the 'Lead Mines' than to have lived in this miserable hole (California)."

== Personal life; illness and death ==
Hamilton (never married) was said to have presented a rough, garish appearance, though he was said to have looked like "the living image of his father [Alexander Hamilton]," who was known to have been quite handsome:

This morning Col. Wm. Hamilton, son of Alexander Hamilton of Revolutionary memory passed our camp. He is a small, active, smart looking man, apparently fifty, and was once undoubtedly a very handsome man. His exterior is now not of the smoothest, though a decent hat would much improve it. He was wearing, or rather is capped with, an old, rusty, torn, shockingly dilapidated, part of a straw hat – the major part it is true, but a very considerable minority has seceded.

In The Intimate Life of Alexander Hamilton, his portrait is incorrectly labeled "Philip Hamilton (the first): age 20" by Allan McLane Hamilton, though Philip Hamilton was killed in a duel at age 19 and there are no known surviving portraits of Philip Hamilton. Though it was clarified in subsequent works that the portrait was in fact of William Stephen Hamilton, this idea was propagated for over a century, including at the height of the musical Hamilton's popularity.

Hamilton had been in California about one year when he died from what he called "mountain fever", most likely cholera during an 1850 epidemic. Before his death Hamilton fell ill for two weeks. He suffered multiple symptoms, including dysentery, and, according to his doctor, died from "malarial fever resulting in spinal exhaustion terminating in paralysis superinduced by great bodily and mental strain."

William Stephen left the upper-midwestern United States around November 1850 for Sacramento, California. Calculating conception, pregnancy, and birth would appear that neither William or Christina may have known that she was with child before he left on his ill-fated destination.

William and Christine would have met somewhere near Fort Madison, Iowa region. Stellern's family were recent German-Jewish immigrants who achieved land ownership and subsequent wealth quickly in the early 1800s in the US. With Williams full departure, Christina married married Fred Kraft, a wealthy recent German immigrant St. Louis area land owner, minerals surveyor, post office general, and saloon owner. He founded the city of Baden, Missouri which Christine, John A., and Fred Kraft would all live in until their deaths.

It appears that no Hamilton relatives ever knew that Christine Stellern or John A. Kraft existed, however, John A. Kraft had 5 children, with those children having children. Today, William has several living relatives through John A. Kraft, including males who carry the paternal haplogroup (I-M253) which is the same as, and is descended from William's father, American founding father, Alexander Hamilton.

William S. Hamilton died in Sacramento, California, on October 9, 1850, at age 53.

He was interred in the Sacramento Historic City Cemetery. The section of the cemetery where he is buried was named Hamilton Square in his honor.

== Images ==
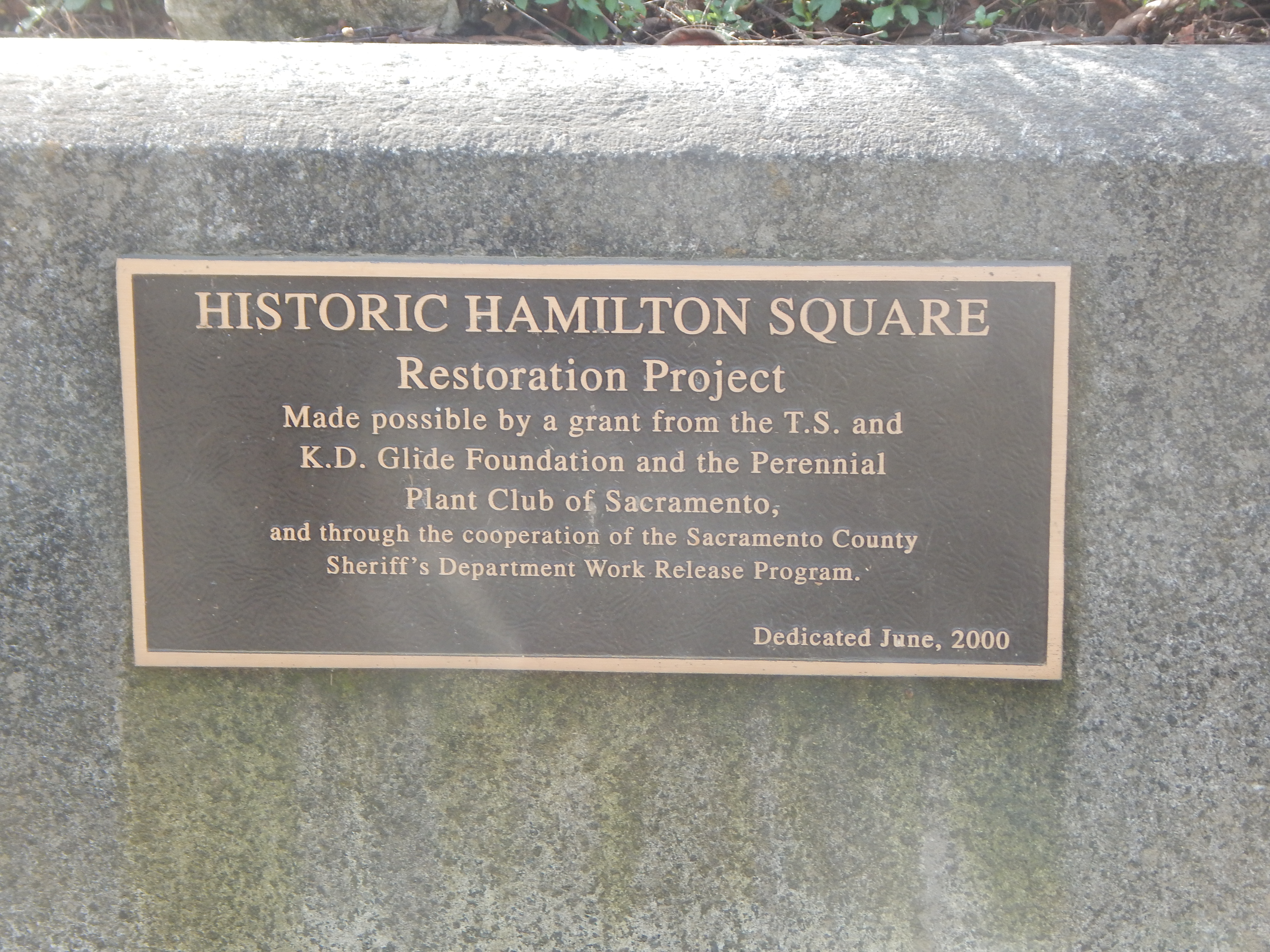
Hamilton Square, Sacramento City Cemetery (plaque)

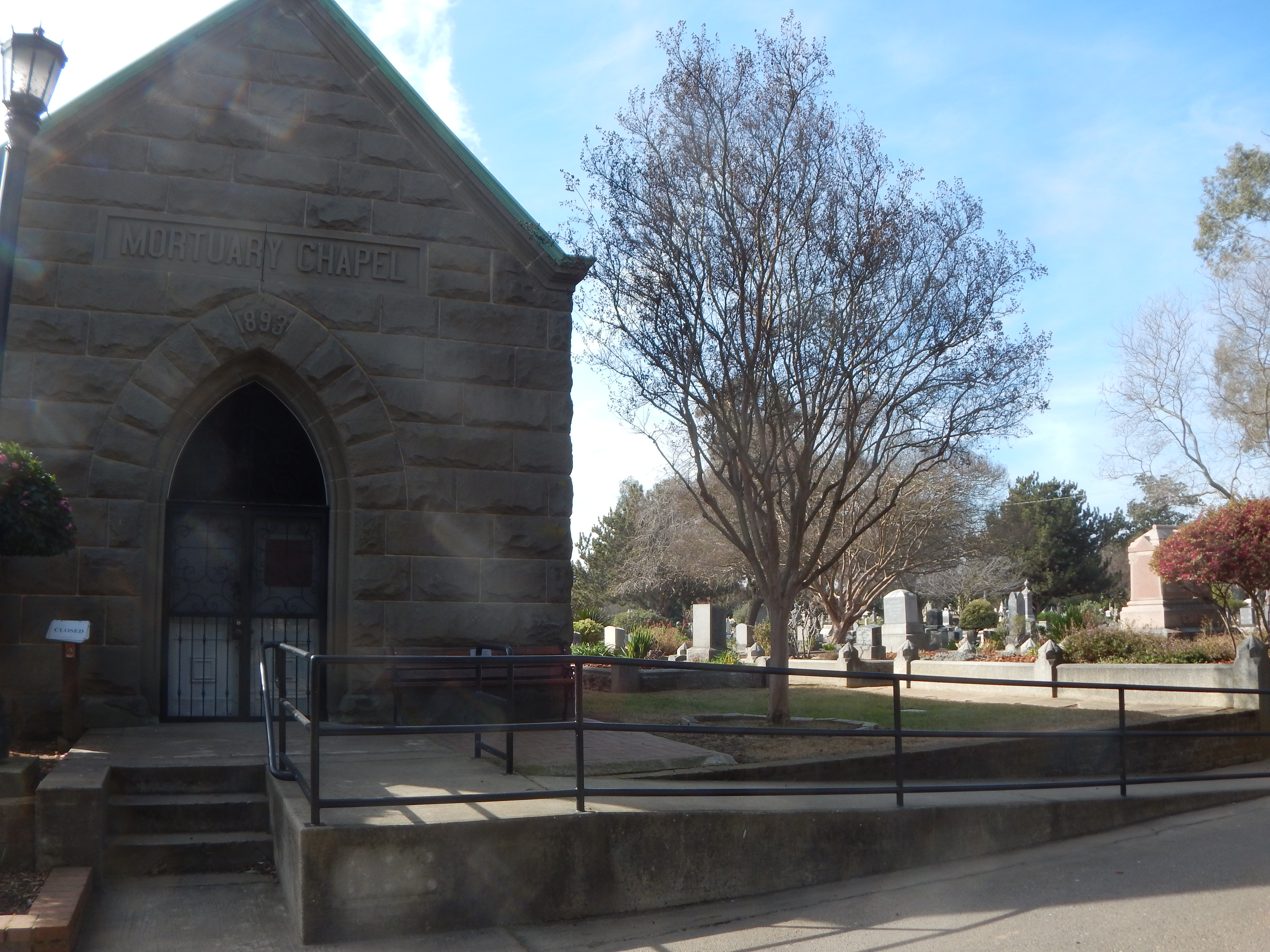
Hamilton Square, Sacramento City Cemetery

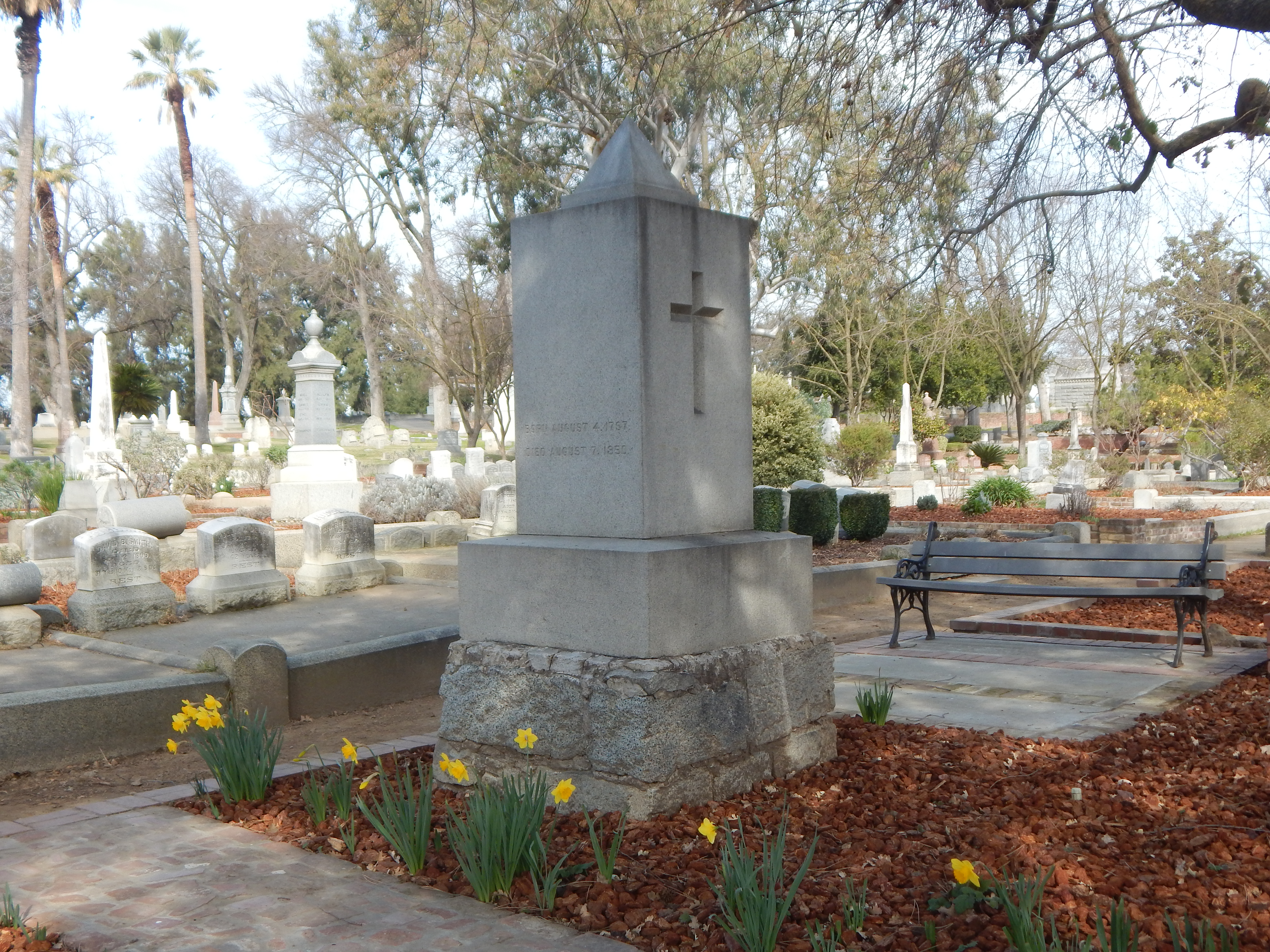
Hamilton's grave monument

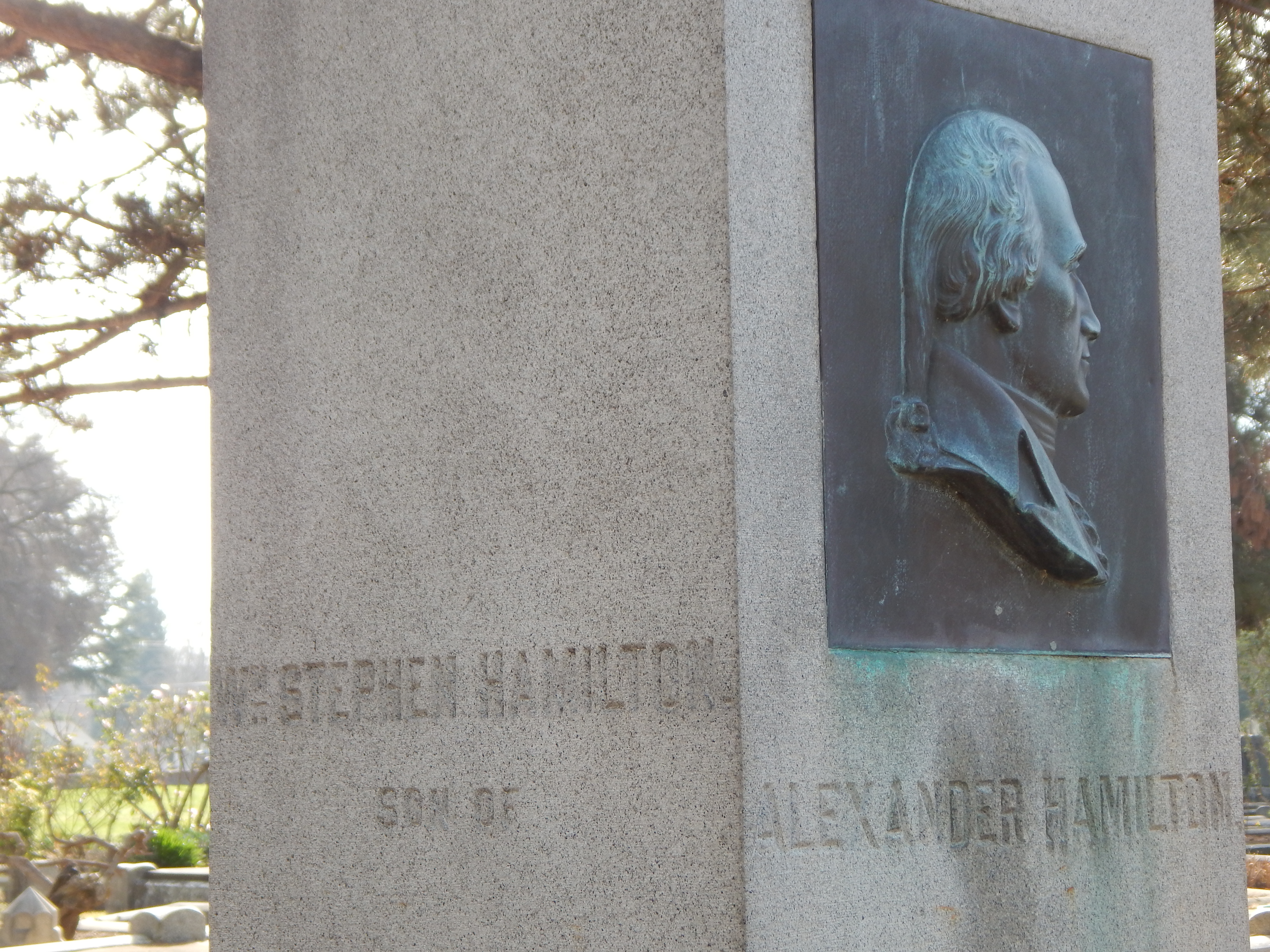
Hamilton's grave monument (closeup). The image is of his father.
