= Kellogg's Grove =

Archaeological site in Illinois, United States

- U.S. National Register of Historic Places
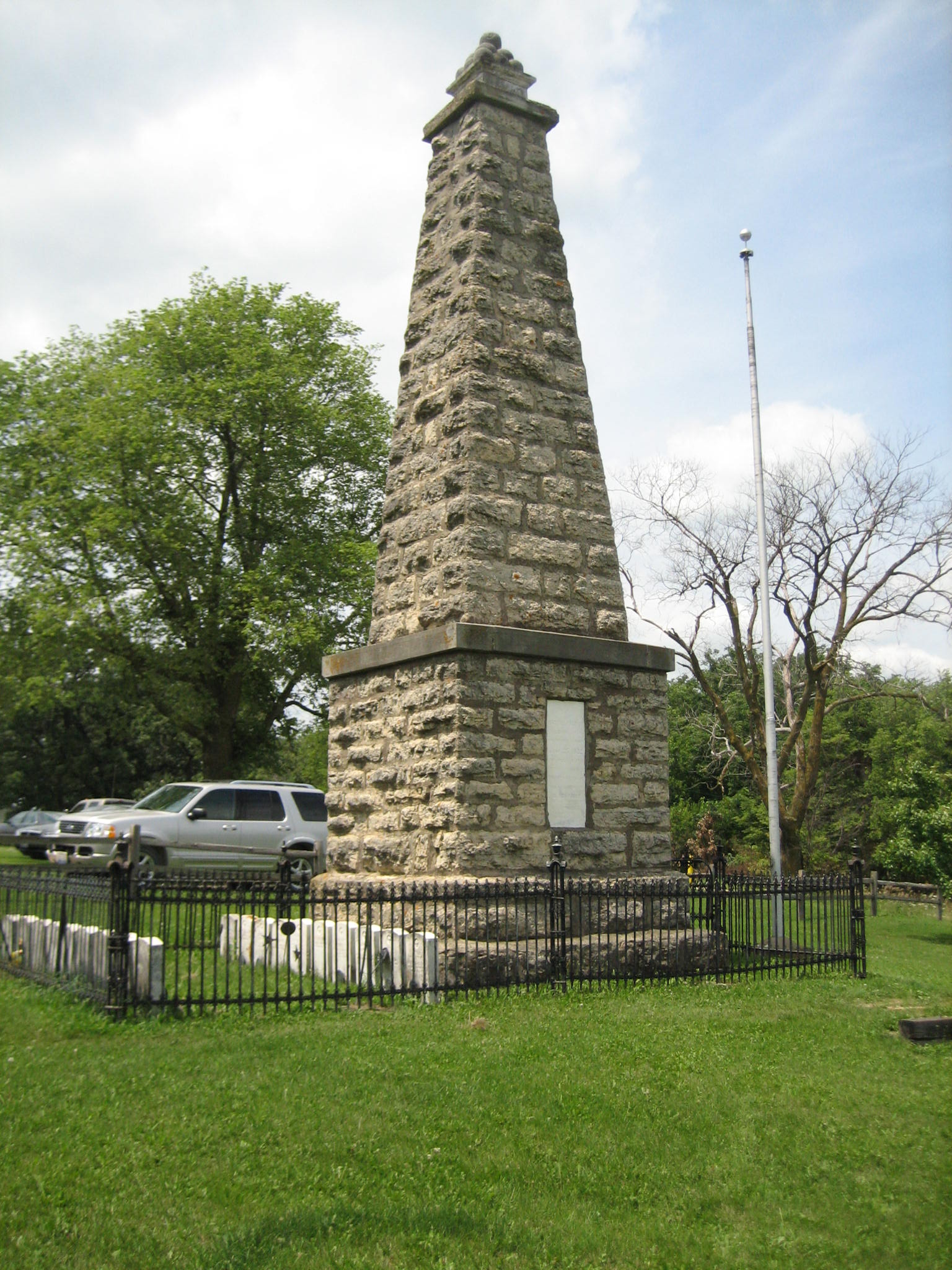
- The monument and cemetery at Blackhawk Battlefield Park.
- Location: Stephenson County, Illinois
- Nearest city: Kent
- Coordinates: 42°17′45″N 89°52′53″W
- Area: 56 acres (23 ha)
- Built: 1827
- NRHP reference No.: 78001191
- Added to NRHP: June 23, 1978

Kellogg's Grove is an area in western Stephenson County, Illinois, United States near the present-day unincorporated town of Kent. The grove is considered historically significant because it was the site of two minor skirmishes during the Black Hawk War in 1832. Today, most of the grove is privately owned but 1.5 acres (6,100 m^{2}) are allocated as a park owned by Stephenson County. While most of the battle occurred on what is today private property the park contains a monument dedicated to the battle and cemetery with the graves of several militia members killed during the skirmish at Kellogg's Grove. The cemetery also holds the graves of those killed in other area battles. The Kellogg's Grove battle site was added to the U.S. National Register of Historic Places in 1978.

== Grove ==
The area of Kellogg's Grove is associated with two skirmishes that occurred during the Black Hawk War and encompasses approximately 56 acres (23 ha) located on a ridgeline overlooking the Yellow Creek Valley to its west, north and east, and the Plum River Valley to its south and west. Today, all but 1.5 acres (6,100 m^{2}) of the grove are privately owned. The privately owned portions of Kellogg's Grove include the area where the original Kellogg Cabin was located as well as the remains of the lead wagon Kellogg Trail from Galena to Peoria. The same, privately owned, areas are where the actual skirmishes during the Battle of Kellogg's Grove occurred. When the grove was nominated for inclusion on the U.S. National Register of Historic Places wagon ruts still remained from the old trail, as did the foundation of the old cabin. Kellogg's Grove was listed on the National Register on June 23, 1978.

== History ==
Kellogg's Grove, originally known as Burr Oak Grove, was a high point along a Native American trail between Peoria and Prairie du Chien, later the trail was used by fur traders. During the 1820s people began to move from southern Illinois into the lead producing areas in and around Galena, Illinois in the far northwestern corner of the state. New York state native, and brother-in-law to the founder of Dixon, Illinois John W. Dixon, Oliver W. Kellogg was one of the people who helped develop the wagon trail from Galena to Peoria.

In 1827 Kellogg settled in the grove and built his log cabin and barn on the site. Kellogg's cabin was often used as a wayside inn by stagecoach travelers along the lead trail and the area along the trail became known as Kellogg's Grove. When the Kelloggs moved south to Buffalo Grove in 1831 the area became known as "Kellogg's Old Place."

Kellogg's Grove was the site of two skirmishes during the Black Hawk War in June 1832. The first skirmish took place on June 15, 1832 and resulted in the deaths of three members of the militia. The second skirmish occurred on June 25 and killed five militia members and at least nine Native Americans. Much of the second battle was fought at the Kellogg log cabin and barn where 25 horses and three militia men were killed. The Native American forces in the battle were under the command of Black Hawk. The militia commanders were, Captain Adam Wilson Snyder during the first battle and a Major John Dement during the second battle. The day after the second battle a company of Illinois militia that included Abraham Lincoln arrived to help bury the dead. Lincoln later made a statement reflecting on that day's events that was quoted by Carl Sandburg in his book Abraham Lincoln The Prairie Years. The June 25 battle at Kellogg's Grove was the last battle or skirmish of the Black Hawk War to be fought in Illinois.

== Park ==
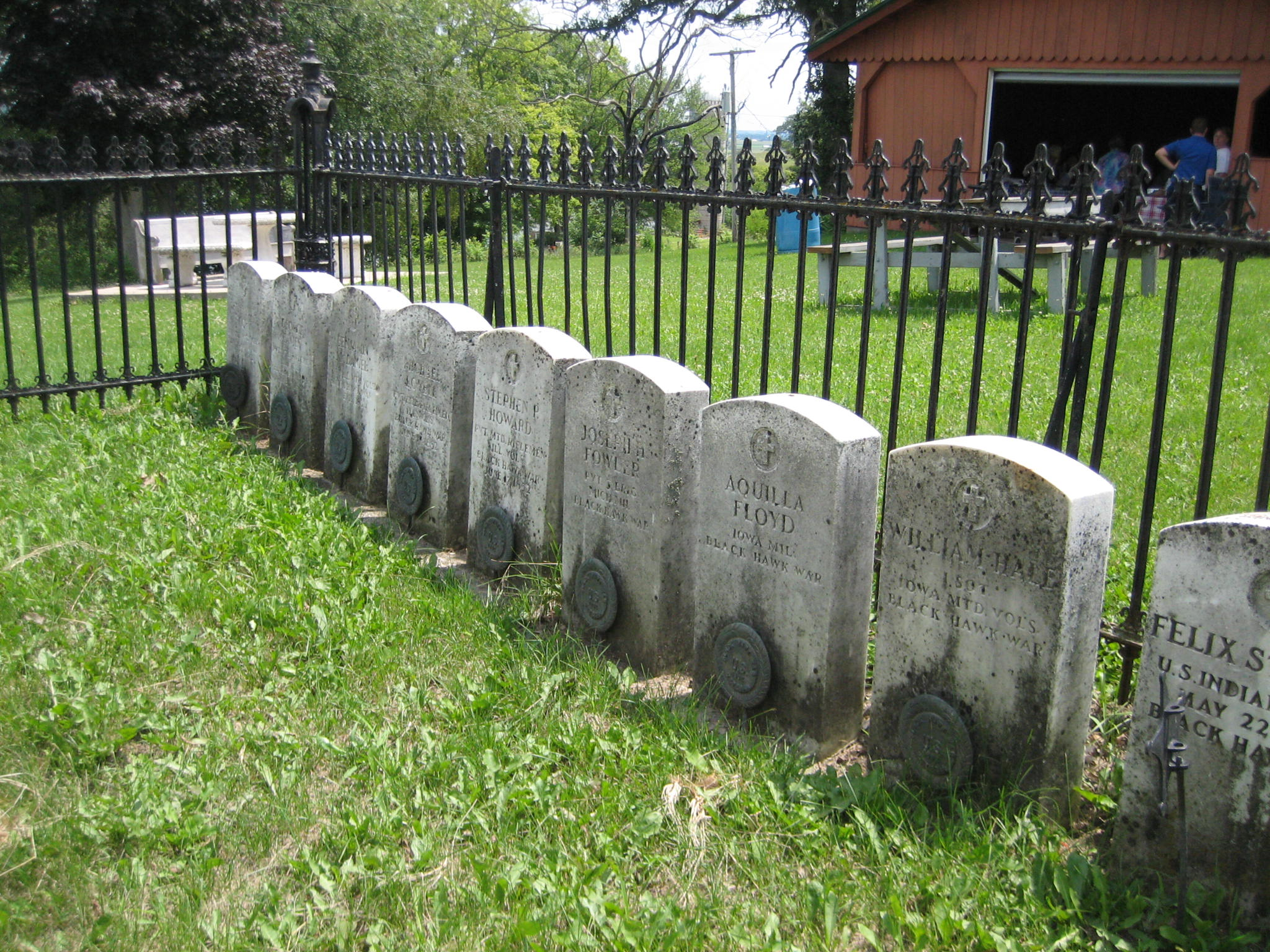
The cemetery includes the graves of victims of the St. Vrain massacre.

In 1886 Stephenson County obtained the title to a 1.5-acre (6,100 m^{2}) tract of land within the original Kellogg's Grove area. This area was converted into a park which includes a monument and small cemetery commemorating the Battle of Kellogg's Grove and the Battle of Waddams Grove, another skirmish which occurred near the present-day community of Waddam's Grove. Blackhawk Battlefield Park is located near the small, unincorporated community of Kent, Illinois. Besides the monument the park includes picnic areas, a shelter, and playground, and in 1981 a log cabin was moved to the site.

The monument was erected in 1887 and is constructed from native limestone, on its sides are three marble plaques. The apex of the monument is topped with a pyramid of cannonballs. It is 8 feet (2.4 m) square at its base and 3 feet (0.91 m) square at its top and stands 34 feet (10 m) tall. At the foot of the monument is a small cemetery which contains the graves of militia men killed in four separate engagements during the Black Hawk War. The monument and cemetery are enclosed by a 15-by-25-foot (4.6 by 7.6 m) wrought iron fence.

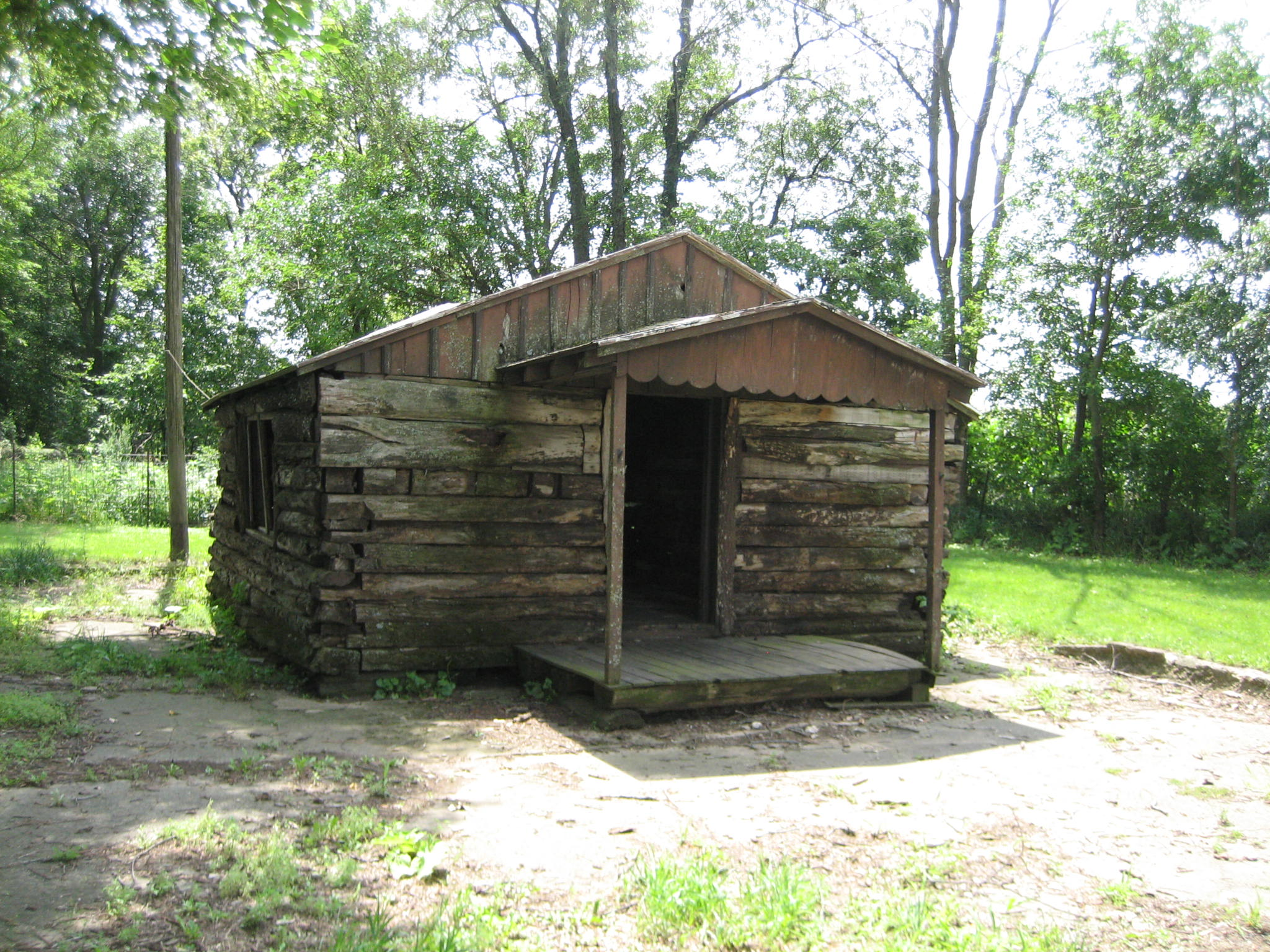
The log cabin at the park was moved to the site in 1981.

The cemetery contains the graves of Felix St. Vrain, Joseph H. Fowler, William Hale, and Aquila Floyd, all killed during the St. Vrain massacre on May 24, 1832. It also has the graves of those killed in both Battles of Kellogg's Grove, those include: Mecomson, Benjamin Scott and Benjamin McDaniel, killed during the first skirmish and James Black, James B. Bank, Abner Bradford, Marcus Randolph, and Robert Meek, all killed during the second skirmish. Finally, the cemetery contains the graves of three militia men killed during the Battle of Waddam's Grove and two militia men killed at other times during the Black Hawk War.

Of the men buried at Kellogg's Grove only the five killed in the second battle at the site were originally buried in the grove. Most of the graves were located at the spots where the militia men fell. During the 1880s area farmers began a movement to collect those remains and bury them at one spot with a fitting monument, which led to the 1887 erection of the current stone monument and cemetery at the site.

A statue of Abraham Lincoln by local Freeport, Illinois sculptor Jay Castro was installed at the park in June, 2018. Lincoln was 23 years old when he came here to bury the dead from the Blackhawk War. ″I tried to show compassion… so I came up with Lincoln leaning on a shovel, head bowed in reverence, and carrying a rifle signifying war”.
