= Waddams Grove, Illinois =

Waddams Grove Wadam's
- Unincorporated community
- Location of Waddams Grove within Illinois Waddams Grove (the United States)
- Coordinates: 42°25′03″N 89°53′03″W
- Country: United States
- State: Illinois
- County: Stephenson
- Township: West Point
- Established: 1832
- Elevation: 1,024 ft (312 m)
- Time zone: UTC-6 (CST)
  - Summer (DST): UTC-5 (CDT)
- Postal code: 61048
- Area code: 815
- GNIS feature ID: 420355

Waddams Grove, previously known as Wadam's, Waddam's Grove, and Sada, is an unincorporated community in the Stephenson County township of West Point, Illinois, United States. Waddams Grove was the first settlement in Stephenson County. It is located northwest of Lena. The community is near the site of the Battle of Waddams Grove which took place during the Black Hawk War.

== History ==
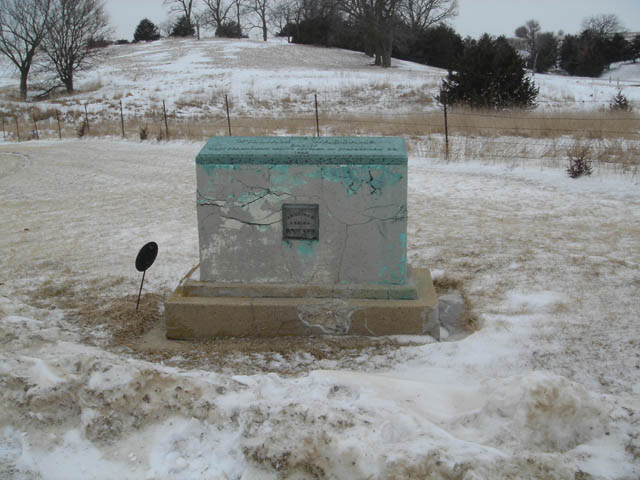
In 1934, this marker was placed to commemorate Waddams' settlement.

Toward the end of the summer of 1832, William Waddams, and his sons Hiram and Nelson, arrived in Stephenson County and founded Waddams Grove following the end of the Black Hawk War. This created the first permanent settlement in the county, and paved the way for future settlements. Waddams moved his family from Jo Daviess County in the spring of 1833 to the new settlement, and built his home there. Waddams would stay in the community until his death after having lived in other settlements including in Indiana, Peoria, Illinois, and Galena, Illinois. Waddams Grove is considered the launching spot for all other settlements in Stephenson County; most settlers stopped at Waddams Grove before moving on to their land claims.

From 1832 to 1836, Waddams Grove continued to see strong growth. When Stephenson County was established in 1837, the settlement was not one of the settlements selected for the future location of the county seat. The settlement's first U.S. Post Office opened on March 31, 1838, and would continue to function in the village of Waddams Grove until July 28, 1859. The village changed its name to Wadam's, and then again changed its name to Sada. Sada changed its name back to Waddams Grove on January 14, 1876, and the name remains to this day.
