= Fort Hamilton (Wisconsin) =

Coordinates: 42°38.201′N 89°57.163′W

Fort Hamilton was a frontier fort constructed in present-day Wiota, Wisconsin during the 1832 Black Hawk War.

== History ==
Fort Hamilton was one of the hastily constructed frontier forts built in Wisconsin with the onset of the 1832 Black Hawk War. Fort Hamilton was located in present-day Wiota, Wisconsin (then Hamilton's Digging's) near the location of the modern settlement. During the course of the Black Hawk War no attack was made on Fort Hamilton but four members of its garrison were killed during the war.

== Description ==
The stockade was a 40 foot by 40 foot square with a 16 foot by 24 foot blockhouse. The fort was surrounded by a ditch and pickets.

The Zimmerman Cheese plant is now located on the site. There is a billboard with a drawing of the Fort located there.

== See also ==
- William S. Hamilton
