= John Allen Wakefield =

American politician

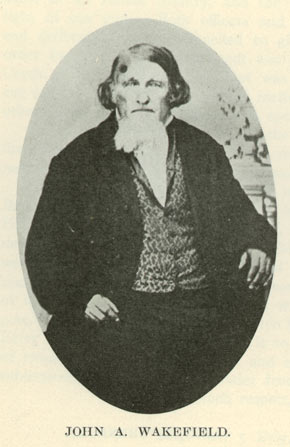
- Purportedly Wakefield's only portrait, first published in 1903
- Born: John Allen Wakefield; February 11, 1797; Pendleton, South Carolina, U.S.
- Died: June 18, 1873 (aged 76); Lawrence, Kansas, U.S.
- Occupations: Historian, politician, soldier, medical doctor, and lawyer

John Allen Wakefield (February 11, 1797 – June 18, 1873) was an American historian, politician, soldier, medical doctor, and lawyer.

Born in Pendleton, South Carolina, Wakefield moved with his family to Tennessee, Kentucky, and then to Illinois, where they settled. During the War of 1812, Wakefield served in the Illinois militia as a scout. He later studied medicine and became a medical doctor. He then studied law and was admitted to the Illinois Bar. Wakefield served in the Illinois House of Representatives as well.

In 1832, Wakefield took part in the Black Hawk War and wrote a book discussing the war, especially the Bad Axe massacre, near present-day Victory, Wisconsin. Wakefield moved to Saint Paul, Minnesota in 1849, where he owned the Tremont House and became the first justice of the peace.

After living for a time in Iowa, John Wakefield moved to Lawrence, Kansas, where he took part in the Bleeding Kansas events. In 1864, Wakefield served in the Kansas House of Representatives. He died in Lawrence, Kansas, in 1873.
