= Battle of Wisconsin Heights =

Battle in the 1832 Black Hawk War

Coordinates: 43°14′03″N 89°44′22″W

- Part of the Black Hawk War
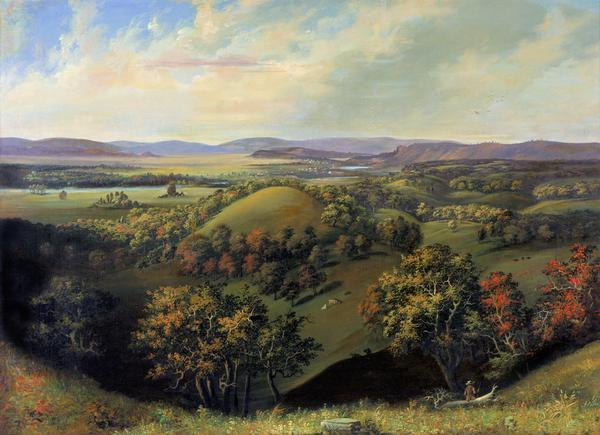
- An early depiction of the battlefield near present-day Sauk City, Wisconsin
Date	July 21, 1832
Location	Near present day Sauk City, Wisconsin
Result	U.S. victory

Belligerents
United States; Menominee	Sauk/Meskwaki

Commanders and leaders
Henry Dodge; James D. Henry	Black Hawk

Strength
600–750 militia	approximately 50–80 warriors

Casualties and losses
1 killed 8 wounded	40–70 killed

The Battle of Wisconsin Heights was the penultimate engagement of the 1832 Black Hawk War, fought between the United States state militia and allies, and the Sauk and Meskwaki tribes, led by Black Hawk. The battle took place in what is now Dane County, near present-day Sauk City, Wisconsin. Despite being vastly outnumbered and sustaining heavy casualties, Black Hawk's warriors managed to delay the combined government forces long enough to allow the majority of the Sauk and Meskwaki civilians in the group to escape across the Wisconsin River. This reprieve was temporary; when the militia finally caught up with the fleeing band it resulted in the Bad Axe massacre at the mouth of the Bad Axe River.

== Background ==
As a consequence of an 1804 treaty between the Governor of Indiana Territory and a group of Sauk and Meskwaki leaders regarding land settlement, the Sauk and Meskwaki tribes vacated their lands in Illinois and moved west of the Mississippi in 1828. However, Sauk Black Hawk and others disputed the treaty, claiming that the full tribal councils had not been consulted, nor did those representing the tribes have authorization to cede lands. Angered by the loss of his birthplace, between 1830 and 1831 Black Hawk led a number of incursions across the Mississippi River, but was persuaded to return west each time without bloodshed. In April 1832, encouraged by promises of alliance with other tribes and the British, he again moved his so-called "British Band" of around 1000 warriors and non-combatants into Illinois. Finding no allies, he attempted to return to Iowa but events overtook him and led to the Battle of Stillman's Run. A number of other engagements followed, and the militias of Michigan Territory and Illinois were mobilized to hunt down Black Hawk's band.

After an inconclusive skirmish in late June at Kellogg's Grove, Black Hawk and his band fled the approaching militia through Wisconsin. They had passed through what are now Beloit and Janesville, then followed the Rock River toward Horicon Marsh, where they headed west toward the Four Lakes region (near modern-day Madison). The band camped for the night near Pheasant Branch.

== Prelude ==
The U.S. force of 600–750 militia men had picked up Black Hawk's trail following the Battle of Pecatonica. Colonel Henry Dodge and James D. Henry pursued the band up the Rock River, engaging in minor skirmishes along the way. The militia marched 25 miles (40 km) from Four Lakes the day of the battle, discovering the body of a dead Native American along the way, in whose pouch they found the watch of George Force, a lieutenant who was killed in an attack at Fort Blue Mounds on June 20. Ahead of the main party of militia, a small band of U.S. allied Ho-Chunk warriors had been sent ahead to scout the area with Pierre Pauquette, a trader from Portage, Wisconsin. Rumors that Black Hawk's band was at Lake Koshkonong persisted and Dodge and his men attempted to intercept Black Hawk there. Although Black Hawk's band had already moved on by the time the militia arrived at the lake, they found evidence of his presence and picked up his trail again, continuing their pursuit toward the Wisconsin River.

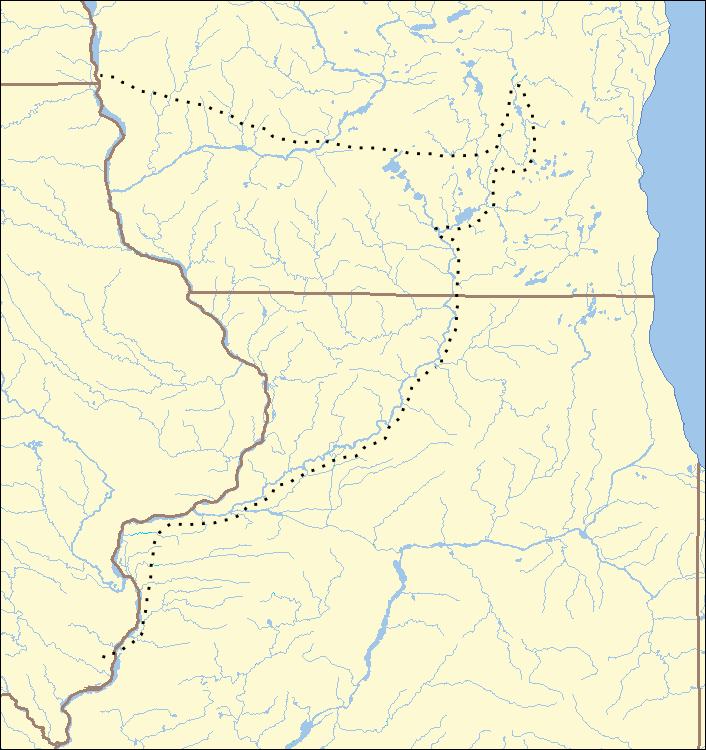
Map of Black Hawk War sites
Battle (with name) Fort / settlement Native village
Symbols are wikilinked to article

Unable to remain in one place long enough to receive provisions, Black Hawk's group were in poor health and some of them starved to death on the road. Black Hawk stated in his account of the battle that at this point in the war he had every intention of escaping with his people back across the Mississippi River, but on encountering the large U.S. force at Wisconsin Heights he was left with no choice but to fight. His intention was to allow the non-combatants in his band to escape across the Wisconsin River.

== Battle ==
On July 21, 1832, the militia caught up with Black Hawk's band as they attempted to cross the Wisconsin River, near present-day Roxbury, in Dane County, near Sauk City, Wisconsin. As the militia approached the battleground, warriors appeared on the surrounding hillsides, attempting to divert their attention. According to Dodge's account, before the militia met the main body of Black Hawk's band, three U.S. scouts crossed a small band of Sauk or Meskwaki warriors and pursued them to within a mile of their camp. Scouts also killed two Sauk warriors before the real battle began.

The scouts who had pursued the three Sauk back toward their camp returned when warriors from the camp pursued them on horseback. Dodge dismounted his troops and ordered his men to advance to higher ground. The band of warriors, under Black Hawk, moved toward the militia; when they were within 30 yards (27 m) the militia and its allies opened fire. Black Hawk ordered his men to "stand their ground, and never yield it to the enemy." Black Hawk's resolve saved the lives of the bulk of Sauk and Meskwaki present that day at Wisconsin Heights; the warriors fought with the militia while the majority of the civilians escaped, via rafts, across the Wisconsin River.

In the first volley of the battle, one of Black Hawk's warriors was killed instantly and one or two others wounded. Black Hawk's warriors returned fire as they withdrew – straight into the charging militia. Dodge and a Major Ewing came upon the battlefield at Wisconsin Heights first and captured an elevated area that later acquired the name "Militia Ridge". The militia occupied a solid position as General Henry arrived, accompanied by three regiments of mounted Illinois Militia. Henry formed his men into a right angle firing line and exchanged gunfire with Black Hawk's men for around 30 minutes. A Dodge-led bayonet charge ended the battle, sending the remaining warriors scattering-to be pursued by militia – several of whom were killed. The troops did not pursue Black Hawk, Dodge stated, "after consulting with Genl. Henry it was agreed to defer a further attack on the enemy until the next morning."

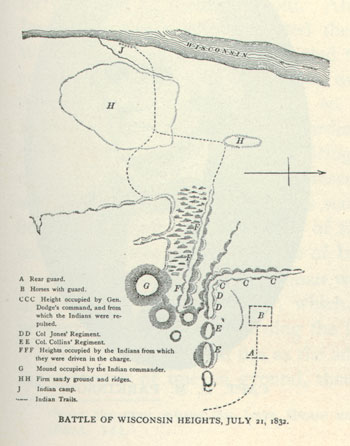
A 1903 map of the battle and the positions of the combatants

Dodge noted the number of Sauk dead at 40, possibly more; he reported that Ho-Chunk scouts and militia men took at least that number of scalps after the battle. U.S. allied Ho-Chunk, during the night following the battle, scalped another 11 Sauk who had been killed by the militia, and Dodge had seen Sauk wounded being carried from the battlefield during the fighting. Dodge's forces suffered one dead and 8 wounded, of whom one was injured during the march to Wisconsin Heights, before the battle.

== Aftermath ==
The U.S. militia decided to wait until the following day to pursue Black Hawk. To their surprise, when morning arrived, their enemy had disappeared. Shortly before dawn one of the leaders accompanying Black Hawk, a Sauk chieftain named Neapope, had attempted from the knoll on which the band had taken refuge to explain to the militia officers that his group wanted only to end the fighting and go back across the Mississippi River. In a "loud shrill voice" he delivered a conciliatory speech in his native Ho-Chunk language, assuming Pauquette and his band of Ho-Chunk guides were still with the militia. However, the U.S. troops did not understand him, because their Ho-Chunk allies had already departed the battlefield.

The one militia man killed in battle, Thomas Jefferson Short, was later buried somewhere on the site where the battle occurred. The battle was devastating for Black Hawk and his band, despite the fact that much of his band escaped across the Wisconsin River; casualty estimates were as high as 70 dead Sauk and Meskwaki, including those killed in action and those drowned. Even so, at least one source called the battle, along with Stillman's Run, one of Black Hawk's major military triumphs.

The militia regrouped at Blue Mounds Fort and picked up Black Hawk's trail again on July 28 near Spring Green, Wisconsin. When they finally caught up with Black Hawk's "British Band" it would lead to the decisive clash of the war at Bad Axe. At the mouth of the Bad Axe River, hundreds of men, women and children would be killed by pursuing soldiers, their Indian allies, and a U.S. gunboat.

The site of the Battle of Wisconsin Heights is preserved in northwestern Dane County, two miles (3 km) southeast of present-day Sauk City on State Highway 78. It is owned by the Department of Natural Resources, and is open to the public. It is the only intact battle site from the American Indian Wars found in the U.S. Midwest. The Wisconsin Heights Battlefield was listed on the U.S. National Register of Historic Places on January 31, 2002.

The location of the battle is confirmed in the Township (Exterior) Notes of U.S. Deputy Surveyor John H. Mullet. The range line (between Roxbury (Section 19 of T9N, R7E) and Mazomanie (Section 24 of T9N, R6E) was surveyed on October 23, 1832, just three months after the battle. Because of this record, there is contemporary and sworn proof of the battle site's location.

== See also ==
- Sixty Years' War
- Black Hawk Purchase
- Indian removal
- Indian termination policy
- Black Hawk War
