= Milton Alexander =

American general (1796–1856)

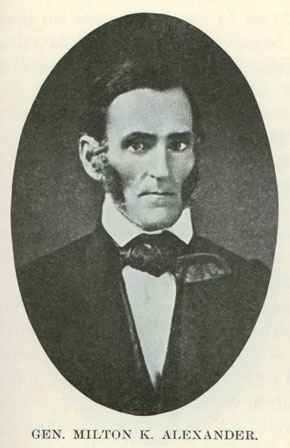
- Born: January 3, 1796
- Died: July 7, 1856 (aged 60)
- Occupation: American politician

Milton King Alexander (January 3, 1796 – July 7, 1856) was an American politician and militia officer who served during the War of 1812, the Seminole Wars and, most notably, as a brigadier general during the Black Hawk War.

== Early life ==
Born to John Brown Alexander and Barbara King in Elbert County, Georgia, he moved with his family to Williamson County, Tennessee in 1804 and, seven years later, moved to Lincoln, Tennessee.

During the War of 1812, he served with the Tennessee Mounted Volunteers under Andrew Jackson and eventually rose to the rank of first lieutenant remaining with Jackson until the capture of Pensacola on November 6, 1814. As Jackson left to prepare the defense of New Orleans, Alexander stayed behind in Florida. He later served with Jackson during the First Seminole War, however he was discharged after becoming too ill for active duty.

Returning to Tennessee, he married Mary Shields and lived in Giles County for several years before moving to the Illinois in 1823. Settling in Paris, Illinois, he became involved in farming and also was a merchant there before being appointed the town's first postmaster, a position he would hold for the next twenty-five years.

In February 1826, he would become appointed clerk of the county commissioner's court. He would hold this position until September 1827, when he resigned to accept a commission in the Illinois Militia from Governor Edward Coles as a colonel in the 19th Regiment Illinois Militia. He was eventually appointed an aide-de-camp to Governor John Reynolds in December 1831 and, shortly before trouble began to appear on the frontier, he was required to go with Reynolds to Rock Island early the following year.

== Service during the Black Hawk War ==
During the first weeks of June 1832, he was one of hundreds of volunteers to report at Dixon's Ferry as General Henry Atkinson was organizing a second campaign against Black Hawk. On June 16, Alexander Posey and Milton Alexander were elected by the brigades they helped organize to command, respectively, the First and Second Illinois Militias.

In the aftermath of the Second Battle of Kellogg's Grove, Alexander was ordered by Atkinson to search the banks below the Galena in order to prevent a possible retreat of Black Hawk's band across the Mississippi River. However, after a fruitless search, Alexander continued along the eastern side of Rock River with Colonel Jacob Fry until reaching a Winnebago village on Whitewater, a tributary of Rock River. Rejoining General Atkinson at Lake Koshkonong on June 3, they were joined by General Posey and Colonel Henry Dodge the following day.

That evening, Atkinson received a report from scouts that they had located the main trail three miles upriver and the main force set out to investigate early the next morning. With Alexander and Dodge searching the west bank of Rock River, they travelled 15 miles before turning back finding no trace of Black Hawk's band.

Eventually running low on provisions, he was sent to get supplies from Fort Winnebago with General Henry and Colonel Dodge. While there, they received news that Black Hawk had been sighted in the area and it was decided that Dodge and Henry would pursue Black Hawk while Alexander would return to the main force with the supplies.

At the Battle of Bad Axe, he and Posey led the right flank and was part of the final charge with Dodge, Henry and Posey which ended the battle. His brigade suffered no casualties with the exception of one soldier who was wounded.

== Later years ==
Following the war, he resumed his duties as postmaster and, in 1837, he was elected by the joint vote of the General Assembly of Illinois to serve as a member of board of commissioners of public works. He was also a longtime member of the Presbyterian Church.

A prominent member of the community, Alexander was also an acquaintance of Abraham Lincoln when he practiced law in Edgar County, Illinois during the early 1850s.

Due to the disease he contracted as a soldier in Florida, he remained an invalid during the last ten years of his life. He eventually died on July 7, 1856.
