= James D. Henry =

- Born: c. 1797; Pennsylvania
- Died: March 5, 1834 (aged 36–37); New Orleans, Louisiana
- Military career
- Allegiance: United States
- Branch: Illinois militia
- Service years: 1827; 1832
- Rank: Brigadier General
- Conflicts: Winnebago War; Battle of Wisconsin Heights (Black Hawk War)

James D. Henry (c. 1797 – March 5, 1834) was a militia officer from the U.S. state of Illinois who rose to the rank of general during the Black Hawk War. Henry was born in Pennsylvania in 1797, and moved to Edwardsville, Illinois in 1822. In 1825, while living in Edwardsville, he was indicted with two other men for the murder of an acquaintance, though he never went to trial. One defendant was tried but found not guilty, and following the trial Henry moved to Springfield, Illinois, where he was elected sheriff. When the Winnebago War broke out in 1827 Henry acted as adjutant for four companies of volunteers.

Henry's military service continued in the prelude of the Black Hawk War of 1832. He was put in command of a regiment in 1831 in response to Black Hawk's incursion into Illinois in 1831. Though Black Hawk left without bloodshed, he would come back in April 1832 and ignite the Black Hawk War. Henry played a major role in the Battle of Wisconsin Heights, leading elements of four mounted Illinois militia regiments in combat against Black Hawk's warriors. After the war, sick with "disease of the lungs," Henry sought respite in New Orleans where he died on March 5, 1834.

== Early life ==
James D. Henry was born in Pennsylvania in 1797. By the time he reached adulthood, Henry was barely able to read or write, having spent much of his time working in trades. In 1822 he arrived in Edwardsville, Illinois, and began working as a mechanic by day, while attending night school.

On January 29, 1825, while at the Benjamin Stephenson House for a party, Daniel D. Smith was stabbed to death. Apparently, an argument occurred and Smith was later found in the dining room with a stab wound, as the group was picking him up he uttered "Winchester," and died. News reports in The Spectator (Edwardsville, Illinois) indicated that Smith was "killed in an affray" at the Stephenson House. Henry, James W. Stephenson, and Palemon Winchester were indicted for the murder. Though all three men were charged with the crime, Stephenson and Henry were released on bond.

Winchester was the only defendant who wound up facing trial in the murder. Winchester's lawyer argued that Smith was guilty of verbal assault against the defendant and Winchester was found not guilty. The verdict was reported in The Spectator on March 22, 1825.

In 1826 Henry moved to Springfield, Illinois, where he worked as a merchant. Soon after arriving in Springfield, Henry was elected sheriff of Sangamon County.

== Military service ==
Henry's first military experience came during the 1827 Winnebago War, while he was working as sheriff. A battalion of four companies was raised in Sangamon County under the command of Colonel Tom M. Neale with Henry acting as adjutant. The group marched to Peoria and then, on to Galena, Illinois. When Red Bird gave himself up, the war ended and the detachment from Sangamon County returned home.

Tension rose through the late 1820s and early 1830s between the United States and Sauk leader Black Hawk's "British Band." On May 27, 1831, as a result of one of several Sauk "invasions" preceding the 1832 Black Hawk War, Illinois Governor John Reynolds called for 700 volunteer soldiers to meet at Beardstown on June 10. 1,600 men showed up at Beardstown on June 10 and the governor accepted them all into service, organizing the troops into two regiments; Henry was appointed commander of the first regiment. The crises ended without bloodshed but less than a year later war would erupt in Illinois and Michigan Territory.

On April 5, 1832, Black Hawk returned to Illinois, this time to stay, and it triggered the Black Hawk War. James D. Henry, by this time a lieutenant colonel in the Illinois militia, was put in command of a spy (i.e. scouting) battalion that was mustered into service in response to an April 16 call for volunteers. Henry's spy battalion was under the command of General Samuel Whiteside. Following the Battle of Stillman's Run, much of the initial force's enlistments expired and they were discharged. When a regiment of volunteers were raised they were put under the command of a Colonel Fry and Henry. The men, a total of 3,200 volunteers, marched to Fort Wilburn (present-day Peru, Illinois) and were organized into three brigades. On June 18, 1832, James D. Henry was elected general of the 1,200 man third brigade.

Following several small massacres and skirmishes, and an inconclusive skirmish in late June at Kellogg's Grove, Black Hawk and his band fled the approaching militia through Wisconsin. They had passed through what are now Beloit and Janesville, then followed the Rock River toward Horicon Marsh, where they headed west toward the Four Lakes region (near modern-day Madison). The British Band camped for the night near Pheasant Branch.

The U.S. force of 600-750 militiamen had picked up Black Hawk's trail following the Battle of Pecatonica. Colonel Henry Dodge and Henry pursued the band up the Rock River, engaging in minor skirmishes along the way. On 21 July 1832, the militia caught up with Black Hawk's band as they attempted to cross the Wisconsin River, in present-day Roxbury Township, in Dane County, near Sauk City, Wisconsin. Dodge and a Major Ewing came upon the battlefield at Wisconsin Heights first and captured an elevated area that later acquired the name "Militia Ridge." The militia occupied a solid position as General Henry arrived, accompanied by three regiments of mounted Illinois militia. Henry formed his men into a right angle firing line and exchanged gunfire with Black Hawk's men for around 30 minutes. A Dodge-led bayonet charge ended the battle, sending the remaining warriors scattering.

== Late life and death ==
When Henry returned from the Black Hawk War it was to public reception and recognition but his time on the campaign had ailed him. He sought respite in the warmer climates of the southern United States. On March 1, 1834, at a public meeting in New Salem, Illinois, attended by Abraham Lincoln, the citizens of New Salem offered Henry their "cordial and hearty support" for the office of Governor of Illinois.

James D. Henry died in New Orleans, Louisiana on March 5, 1834, after contracting a "disease of the lungs." A memorial service for Henry was held at the Sangamon County Courthouse, in Springfield on April 20, 1834, it was attended by Abraham Lincoln and other state dignitaries. The city of Henry, Illinois, established the year he died, was named for him.
