= Victory, Wisconsin =

- Unincorporated community
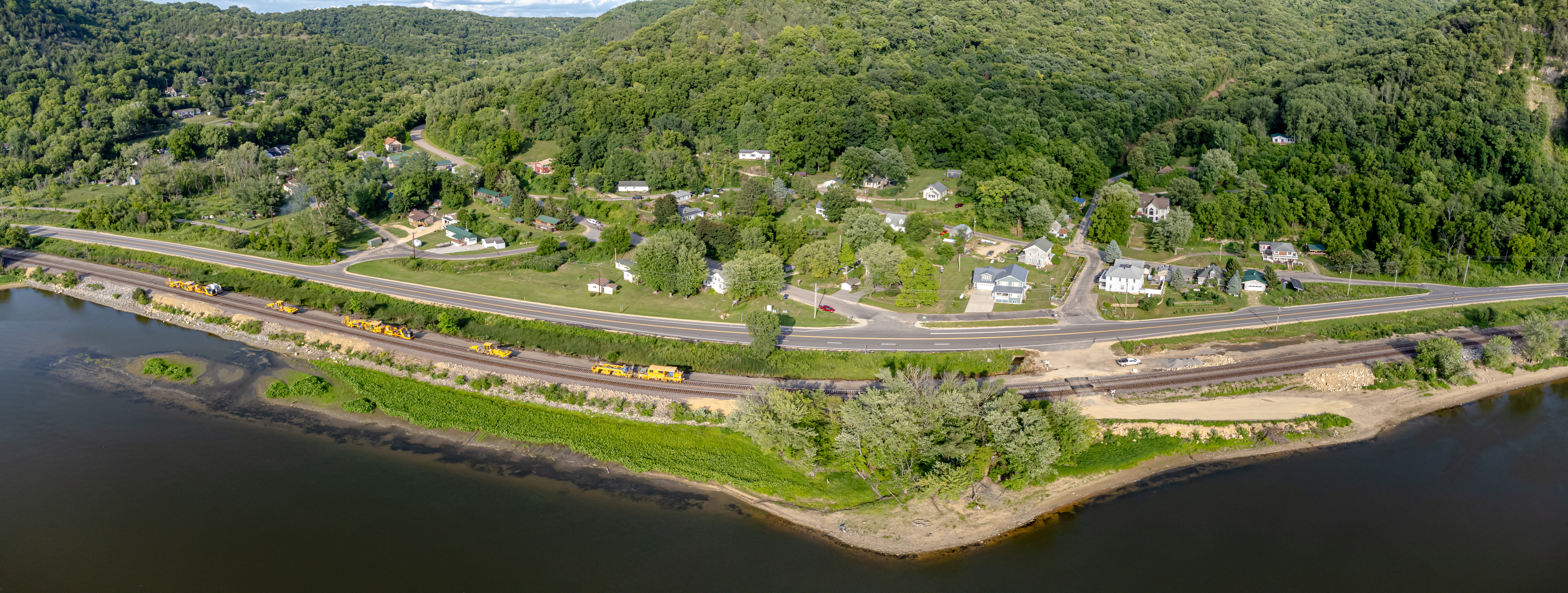

- Location within Wisconsin Location within the United States
- Coordinates: 43°29′08″N 91°12′45″W
- Country: United States
- State: Wisconsin
- County: Vernon
- Elevation: 650 ft (200 m)
- Time zone: UTC-6 (Central (CST))
  - Summer (DST): UTC-5 (CDT)
- Zip: 54663
- Area code: 608
- GNIS feature ID: 1576083

Victory is an unincorporated community in the Town of Wheatland in Vernon County, Wisconsin, United States. It is located 4.5 miles north of De Soto and 6.2 miles south of Genoa on the Mississippi River along the Great River Road (WIS 35). It also is served by the BNSF Railway.

== History ==
The Bad Axe Massacre, the final engagement of the Black Hawk War of 1832, took place near this community. The community's name commemorates the United States victory.

== Gallery ==
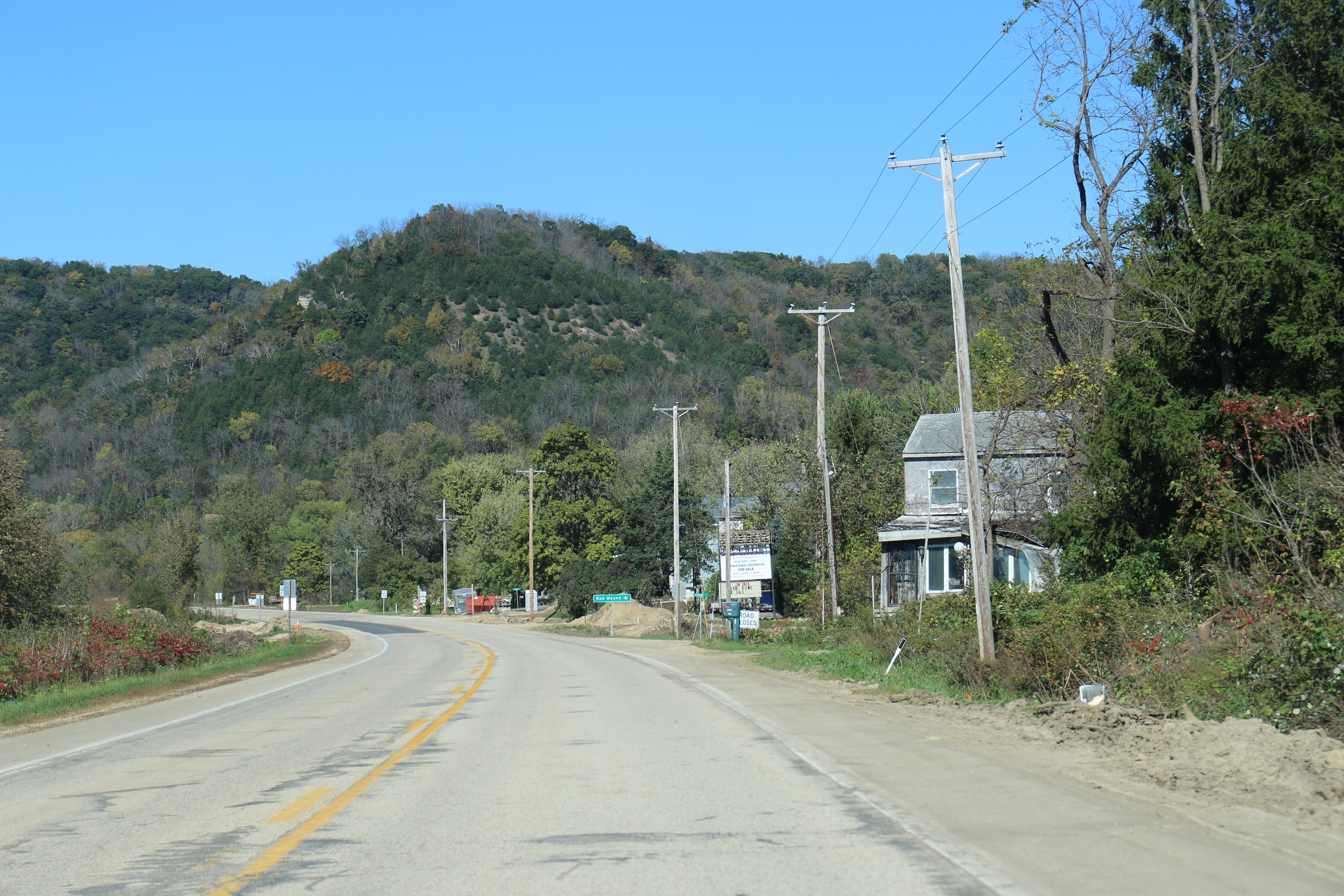

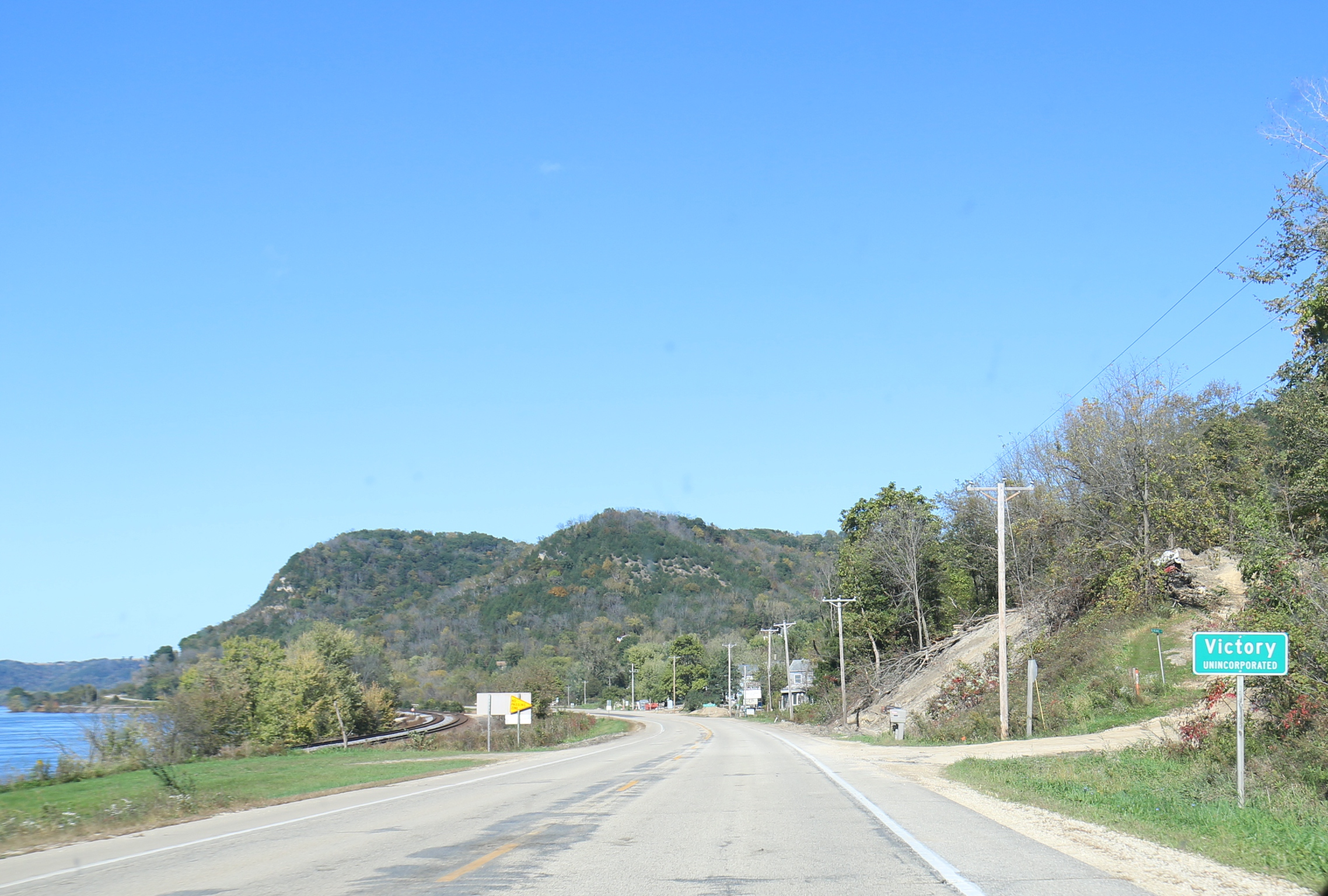
The sign for Victory on WIS35.
