= Bad Axe River =

River in Wisconsin, United States of America

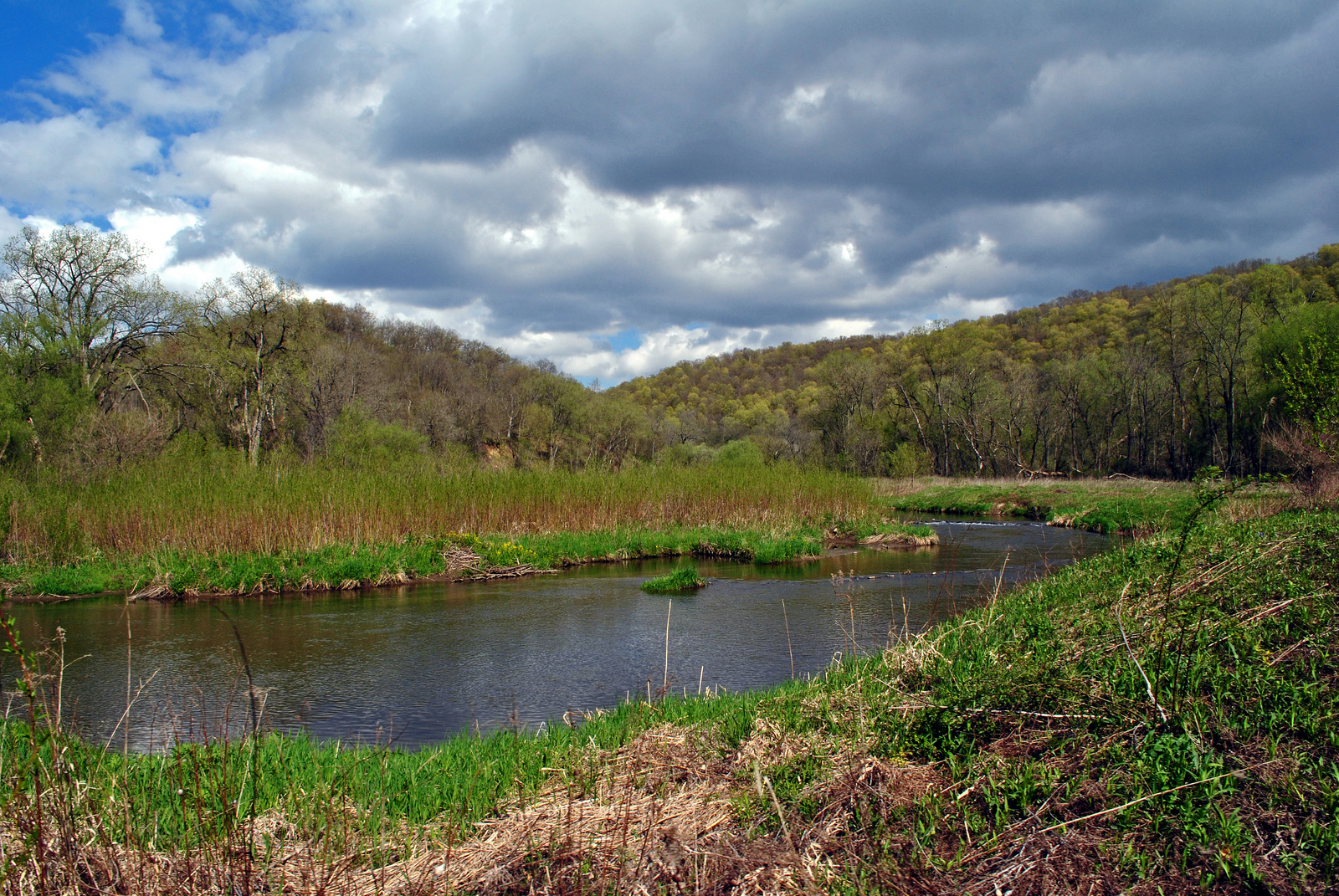
- The North Fork of the Bad Axe River

Location
- Country: United States
- State: Wisconsin
- County: Vernon

Physical characteristics
- Source
  - location: Genoa
  - coordinates: 43°31′40″N 91°09′51″W
- Mouth
  - location: Mississippi River
  - coordinates: 43°31′12.91″N 91°13′40.28″W

The Bad Axe River is a 4.2-mile-long (6.8 km) tributary of the Mississippi River in southwestern Wisconsin in the United States. "Bad axe" is a translation from the French, "la mauvaise hache", but the origin of the name is unknown. The river's mouth at the Mississippi was the site of the Battle of Bad Axe, an 1832 U.S. Army massacre of Sauk and Meskwaki people at the end of the Black Hawk War.

== Course ==
The Bad Axe River flows for its entire length in western Vernon County, and for most of its length as two streams, the North Fork Bad Axe River and the South Fork Bad Axe River. The North Fork rises at the town of Westby and flows generally southwestwardly for 31 miles (50 km). The South Fork rises about 3 miles (5 km) south of Viroqua and flows westwardly for 16 miles (26 km). The main stem of the Bad Axe flows for less than 5 miles (8 km) westward from the convergence of the two forks to its confluence with the Mississippi, about 6 miles (10 km) south of Genoa.

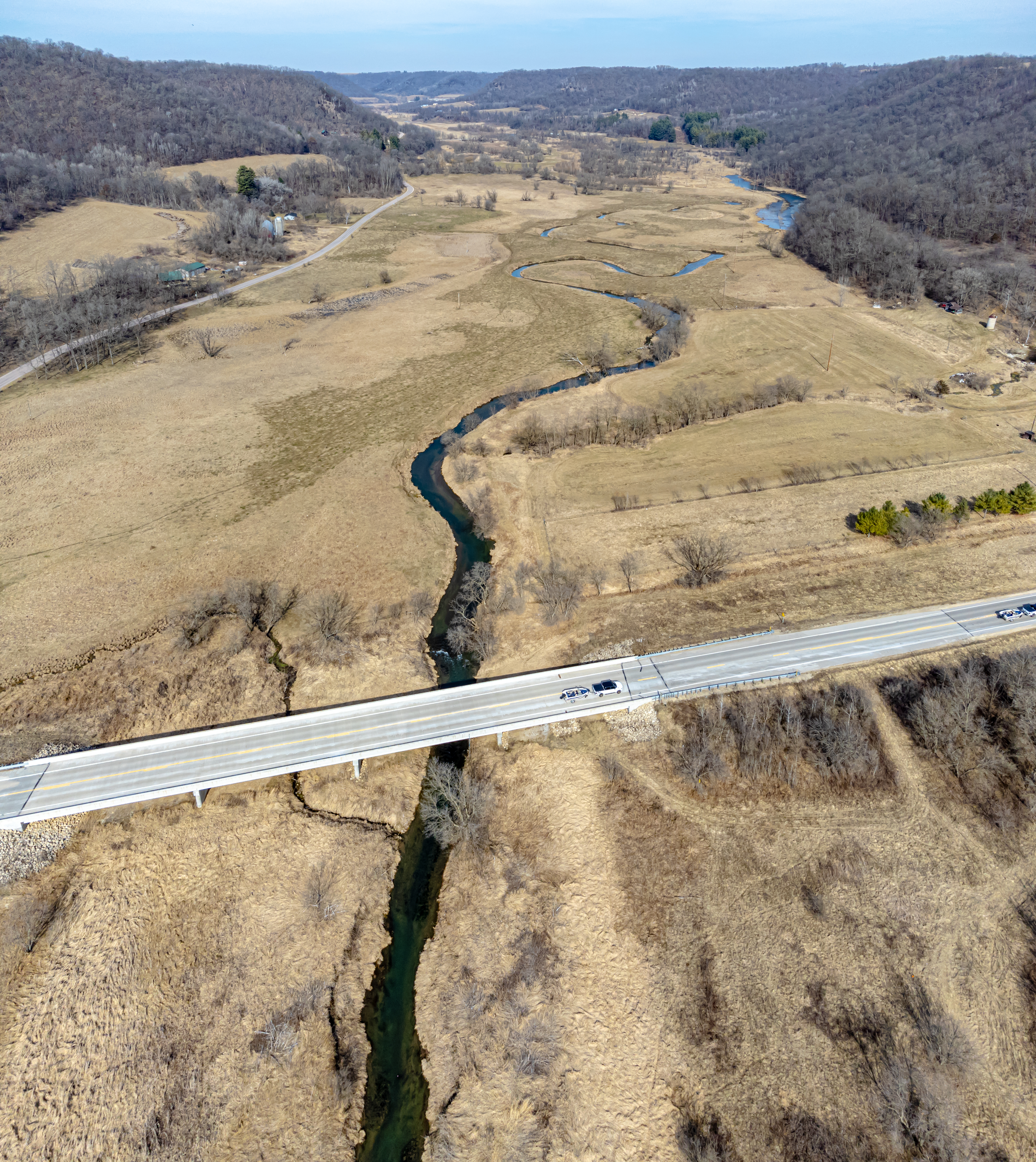
North fork Bad Axe River under Wis-56

== See also ==
- List of Wisconsin rivers
