= Neapope =

Spiritual leader of the Sauk people

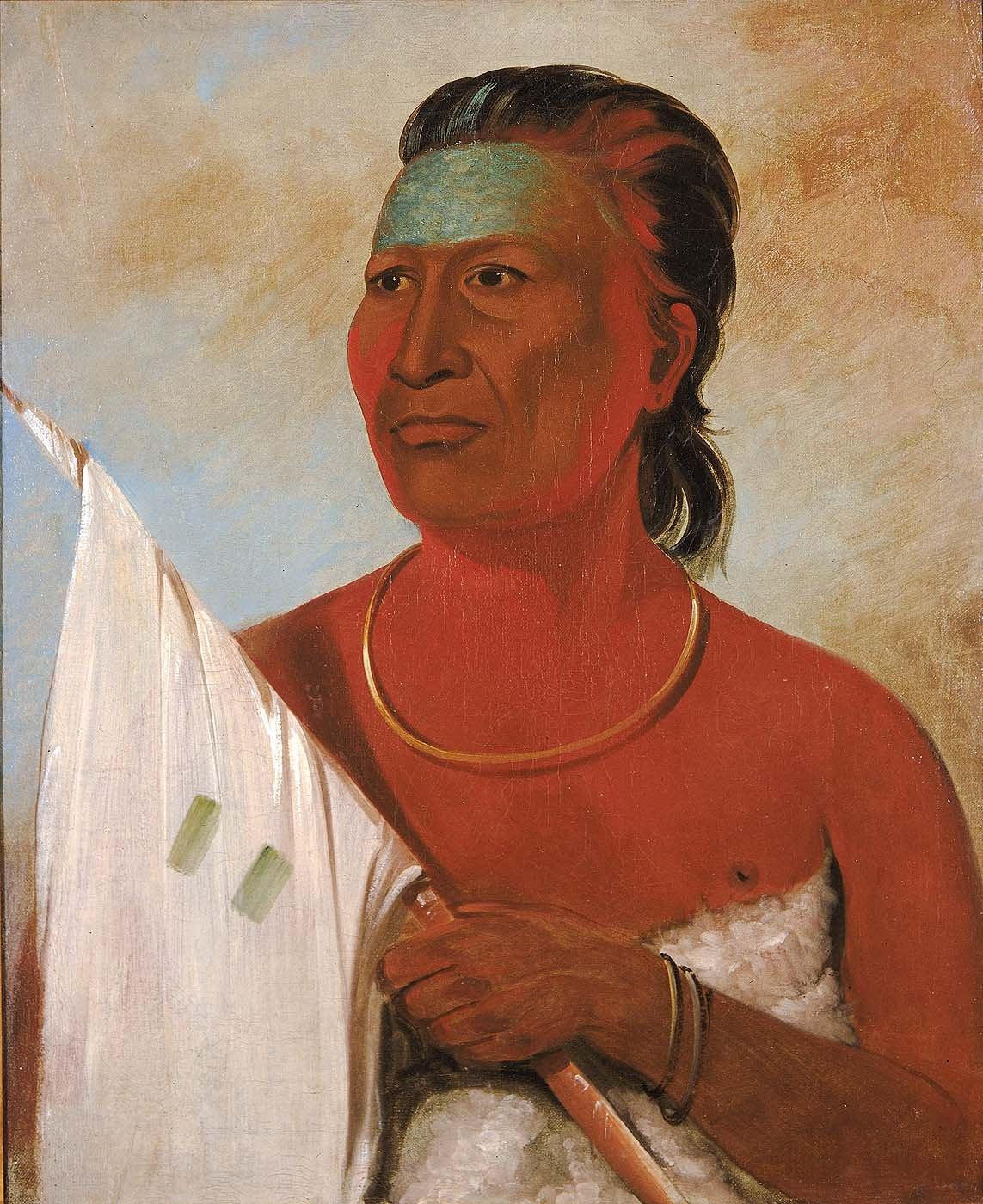
Neapope by George Catlin.

Neapope (Na-pope meaning "Broth" in the Sauk language) was a spiritual leader of the Sauk tribe and advisor to Black Hawk during the Black Hawk War.

== Biography ==
A prominent chieftain of the Sauk prior to the Black Hawk War, Neapope was first consulted by Black Hawk in 1820 on whether to declare war against neighboring American settlers or to move his supporters, including Neapope and Sauk chieftain Keokuk, from Illinois and into Iowa. Although Neapope advised a confederacy, including the Winnebago and Potowatomi in particular, to help defend Black Hawk's tribe, no chieftains would agree to an alliance. Neapope also travelled to Malden, Ontario in an attempt to gain British support from General Gaines, however Gaines declined stating the American settlers had a legal right to the land and advised Black Hawk to remain at peace with local settlers. Returning from Canada, Neapope stopped at the camp of the Winnebago Prophet, Wabokieshiek, where he was assured of support before returning to Black Hawk.

As fighting began, Neapope served throughout the war as one of Black Hawk's leading allies, most notably during the Battle of Wisconsin Heights (near present-day Sauk City, Wisconsin) where he successfully held off local militia while allied forces were able to escape across the Wisconsin River. Near the end of the war, Neapope was captured by Black Hawk's rival Keokuk, who cooperated with American settlers but was imprisoned with Black Hawk until their release several weeks later by President Andrew Jackson and eventually rejoined the Sauks in Iowa.
