= Wisconsin Heights Battlefield =

- U.S. National Register of Historic Places
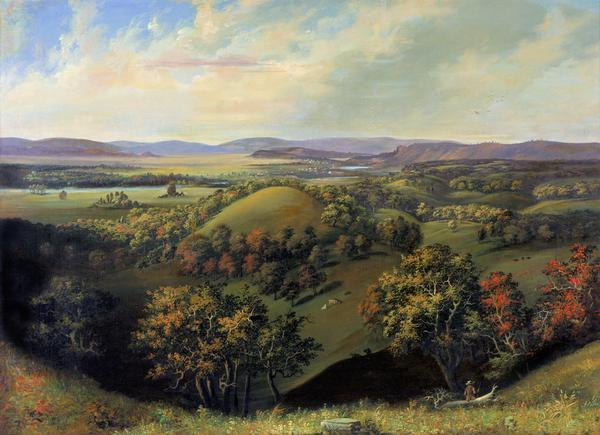
- A 19th-century painting of the battlefield

- Location within Wisconsin Location within the United States
- Location: Dane County, Wisconsin
- Nearest city: Sauk City (in Sauk County)
- Coordinates: 43°14′41″N 89°43′5″W
- Area: 70 acres (28 ha)
- Built: 1832 (battle date)
- NRHP reference No.: 01001553
- Added to NRHP: January 31, 2002

The Wisconsin Heights Battlefield is an area in Dane County, Wisconsin, where the penultimate battle of the 1832 Black Hawk War occurred. The conflict was fought between the Illinois and Michigan Territory militias and Sauk chief Black Hawk and his band of warriors, who were fleeing their homeland following the Fox Wars. The Wisconsin Heights Battlefield is the only intact battle site from the Indian Wars in the U.S. Midwest. Today, the battlefield is managed and preserved by the state of Wisconsin as part of the Lower Wisconsin State Riverway. In 2002, it was listed on the U.S. National Register of Historic Places.

== History ==
Knowledge of the history of native tribes before the middle of the 18th century in the area of Wisconsin Heights Battlefield is limited. Samuel de Champlain is said to have heard of native tribes living "many leagues beyond Lake Huron" during the 17th century. The group Champlain heard about was known as the "Fire Nation" or the "Mascoutens." The Mascoutens, along with the Kickapoo and Miami were probably settled in the area around the Fox River and claimed much of the land to the south, including the battlefield, as their hunting grounds. Eventually, the Mascoutens, Kickapoo and Miami migrated further south along the shore of Lake Michigan.

The relocated Mascoutens were replaced by the influx of Sauk and Meskwaki following the Fox Wars in the western Great Lakes and Detroit regions. After the conflicts, the remaining Sauk and Meskwaki sought refuge together in lands further west, extending north from the Wisconsin River to the Illinois River in the south. Other settlements were established north of the Missouri River.

The area known as the Wisconsin Heights Battlefield was the site of the penultimate engagement of the 1832 Black Hawk War, fought between the United States state militia and allies, and the Sauk and Meskwaki tribes, led by Black Hawk. The battle took place in what is now Dane County, near the present-day Sauk County–Dane County line. Despite being outnumbered and sustaining heavy casualties, Black Hawk's warriors managed to delay the combined forces long enough to allow the majority of the Sauk and Meskwaki civilians in the group to escape across the Wisconsin River.

The battlefield has been described as "beautiful and romantic". Through the early 1920s the area remained privately owned. On a cloudless Labor Day, September 3, 1923, 500 people gathered at the battlefield for the dedication of a marker at the site. A four-foot Bedford limestone marker was installed by a group consisting of the Madison Chapter of the Daughters of the American Revolution (DAR), the Wisconsin Historical Society, and the State Archaeological Society. The monument carried the following inscription:

WISCONSIN HEIGHTS BATTLEFIELD

Near this site the Sauk chieftain Black Hawk
and his band were overtaken by Wisconsin

and Illinois troops on July 21, 1832

For 30 years the DAR marker stood as the sole monument to the battle. The Wisconsin Historical Society installed a metal interpretive marker at the site in 1957. In 1989 Wisconsin Act 31 established the Lower Wisconsin State Riverway, a 92.3-mile (148.5 km) stretch of the Wisconsin River that includes 79,275 acres (320.81 km^{2}) from Prairie du Sac to the river's confluence with the Mississippi River. The Riverway includes the Wisconsin Heights Battlefield, which is protected from future development because of its status as part of the Riverway. Historians continued to shed light on the Battle of Wisconsin Heights and in 1992 a new interpretive marker was installed. The site was dedicated by then-Wisconsin Governor Tommy Thompson in 1998 during Wisconsin's sesquicentennial celebration.

== Battlefield ==
At the time of the Black Hawk War the Wisconsin Heights Battlefield was a marshy area located in the hills along the Wisconsin River. The battlefield is located within the Black Hawk Unit of the state managed and owned Lower Wisconsin State Riverway, along Highway 78, about a mile south of County Road Y, south of Sauk City. There are trails, a historic marker and a parking area at the site. Though the area around the battle site does not include modern amenities, such as plumbing and toilets, the trails within the Black Hawk Unit of the Lower Wisconsin State Riverway stretch three miles (5 km) over rugged terrain. One of the trails, the Wisconsin Heights Battlefield Trail, branches from the main loop and travels through the battle site.

The battlefield has three key areas affiliated with the clash that can be viewed at the modern-day site: "Militia Ridge," where companies of Illinois and Michigan Territory militia formed up for battle; "Sharpshooter Lookout," an overlook where Sauk and Meskwaki warriors opened fire on the militia; and "Spy's Ravine," the area between the ridge and lookout. The whole of the battlefield is best viewed from Sharpshooter Lookout.

== Significance ==
The Wisconsin Heights Battlefield is the only intact battle site from the Indian Wars found in the U.S. Midwest. This significance led to its inclusion in the U.S. National Register of Historic Places on January 31, 2002. It is one of five 1832 Black Hawk War battle sites listed on the National Register. The others are Kellogg's Grove, Apple River Fort, Fort Blue Mounds, and Stillman's Run. The Wisconsin Heights battle site is marked by an official Wisconsin historical marker.

It is not entirely certain that this is the site of the Battle of Wisconsin Heights, but historical sources identify this town and section, and the terrain matches ridges and swamps in descriptions of the battle. Archaeologists working with the Wisconsin DNR have looked for evidence of the battle by visual inspection, by metal detector, and by ground-penetrating radar. Along with modern shotgun shell casings and pop-tops, they found several lead balls from the era of the Black Hawk War, two cartridge case buckles, and a fastener for a leather bag. These don't seem like much evidence, but no archaeological evidence at all has been turned up at other Black Hawk War battlefields.
