= Abraham Lincoln in the Black Hawk War =

Abraham Lincoln
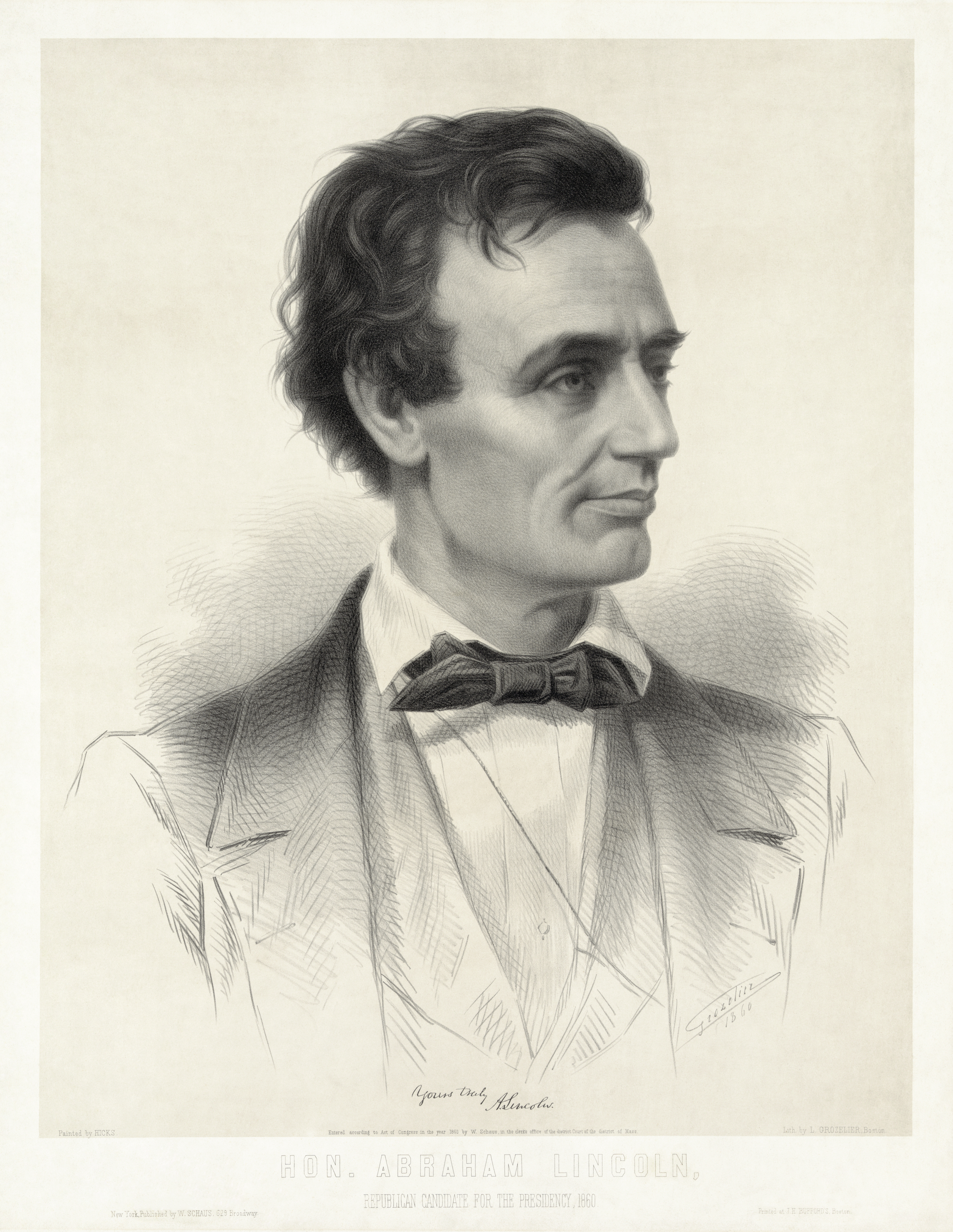
- Lincoln in 1860
- Born: February 12, 1809; Hardin County, Kentucky, U.S.
- Died: April 15, 1865 (aged 56); Washington, D.C., U.S.
- Military career
- Allegiance: United States
- Branch: Illinois Militia
- Service years: April 21, 1832 – July 10, 1832
- Rank: Private (May 28, 1832 – July 10, 1832); Captain (April 21, 1832 – May 27, 1832); Discharged from his command and re-enlisted as a private.
- Nickname: "Honest Abe"
- Commands: Rifle company of the 31st Regiment of Militia of Sangamon County, 1st Division
- Conflicts: Black Hawk War aftermath of: Battle of Kellogg's Grove; Battle of Stillman's Run
- Other work: Illinois State Representative; United States Congressman; President of the United States

Abraham Lincoln served as a volunteer in the Illinois Militia from April 21, 1832 to July 10, 1832, during the Black Hawk War. Lincoln never saw combat during his tour, but he was elected captain of his first company. He was also present in the aftermath of two of the war's battles, where he helped to bury the militia dead. He was mustered in and out of service during the war, going from captain to private and finishing his service in an independent spy company commanded by Captain Jacob Early.

Lincoln's service had a lasting impression on him, and he related tales about it later in life with modesty and humor. Through his service he forged lifelong political connections. In addition, he received a land grant from the U.S. government for his military service. Though Lincoln had no military experience when he assumed command of his company, he was generally regarded as an able and competent leader.

== Background ==
Angered by the loss of his birthplace via prior disputed treaties, and against the best interests of other tribes affected, Black Hawk led a number of incursions across the Mississippi River beginning in 1830. Each time, he was persuaded to return west without bloodshed. In April 1832, encouraged by promises of alliances with other tribes and the British, he again moved his "British Band" into Illinois.

On April 5, 1832, Black Hawk and around 1,000 warriors and civilians recrossed the Mississippi River into Illinois in an attempt to reclaim their land. About half of Black Hawk's band were combatants and the rest were a combination of women, children, and elderly. The band consisted of Sauk, Meskwaki, some Potawatomi, and some Kickapoo; in addition, some members of the Ho-Chunk nation were sympathetic to Black Hawk.

Black Hawk's reasons for crossing into Illinois were to reclaim lost lands, and perhaps create a confederacy of Native Americans to stand against white settlement. Promises of aid from other Illinois tribes were made to the British Band, and Black Hawk believed that promises of assistance were made by the British in Canada.

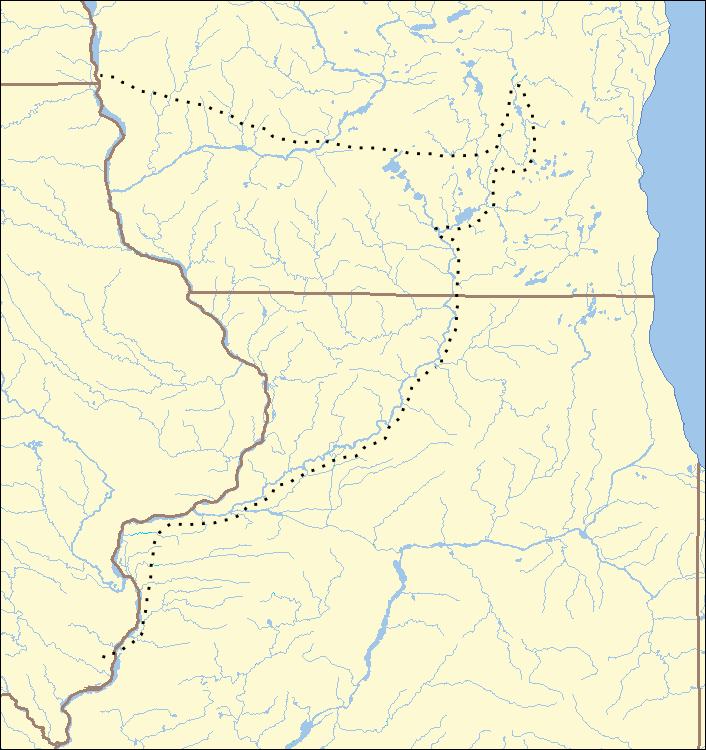
Map of Black Hawk War sites
Battle (with name) Fort / settlement Native village
Symbols are wikilinked to article

Despite this, Black Hawk found no allies, and he attempted to return to Iowa, but ensuing events led to the Battle of Stillman's Run. A number of other engagements followed, and the state militias of Wisconsin and Illinois were mobilized to hunt down Black Hawk's band. The conflict became known as the Black Hawk War.

At the time of Black Hawk's incursion into Illinois, Lincoln was living in New Salem, where he had lived for two years. Prior to the Black Hawk War, in March 1832, Lincoln announced his candidacy for the Illinois House of Representatives, but the election was several months away. One month later, he responded to the governor's call for volunteer militia.

== Enlistment and election as captain ==
On April 21, 1832, Lincoln and the other volunteers gathered at the property of Dallas Scott. Lincoln rode a horse from New Salem to Richland Creek, where neighbors had gathered to form a company of volunteer militia near Beardstown, Illinois. The men were officially sworn in and began the process of electing a company commander who would hold the rank of captain. In the choice between Lincoln and William Kirkpatrick, Lincoln received three-fourths of the votes. Many years later, Lincoln said this election as captain was "a success which gave me more pleasure than any I have had since."

Lincoln was commissioned as a captain in Sangamon County's 31st Regiment, a unit of the militia's 1st Division. By April 30, he had been placed in charge of a rifle company in the 4th Regiment of Mounted Volunteers, a unit of Samuel Whiteside's Brigade.

The men spent time in Beardstown, where they drew provisions and weapons (as many of the men, including Lincoln, owned no weapons). Other downtime in Beardstown was occupied by inter-company rivalry. An incident occurred on April 22, when Lincoln was challenged for a prime camping spot. Lincoln and his challenger, private Lorenzo Dow Thompson, wrestled for the spot and Lincoln was beaten before a crowd of fellow soldiers. After the wrestling match, Lincoln and the other commanders spent April 23–26 conducting light drills and drawing supplies. On April 28, Lincoln's company was enrolled into state service by Colonel John J. Hardin, and Lincoln drew further supplies (including whiskey, food staples, and tin pans). The volunteers marched to Rushville, a distance of 10 miles (16 km), on April 30, 1832.

Following their arrival in Rushville, the troops continued marching for several days toward the mouth of the Rock River. Much of the rest of early May was spent marching and resupplying. General Samuel Whiteside, the brigade commander, moved the volunteers to the Prophet's Village, which they burned on May 11, and then continued the men toward Dixon's Ferry, another 40 miles (64 km) upstream. The men reached Dixon's Ferry on May 12, and the next day, Isaiah Stillman and David Bailey led their troops toward Old Man's Creek, where it was rumored that Black Hawk and his men were encamped.

== War ==
=== Stillman's Run ===
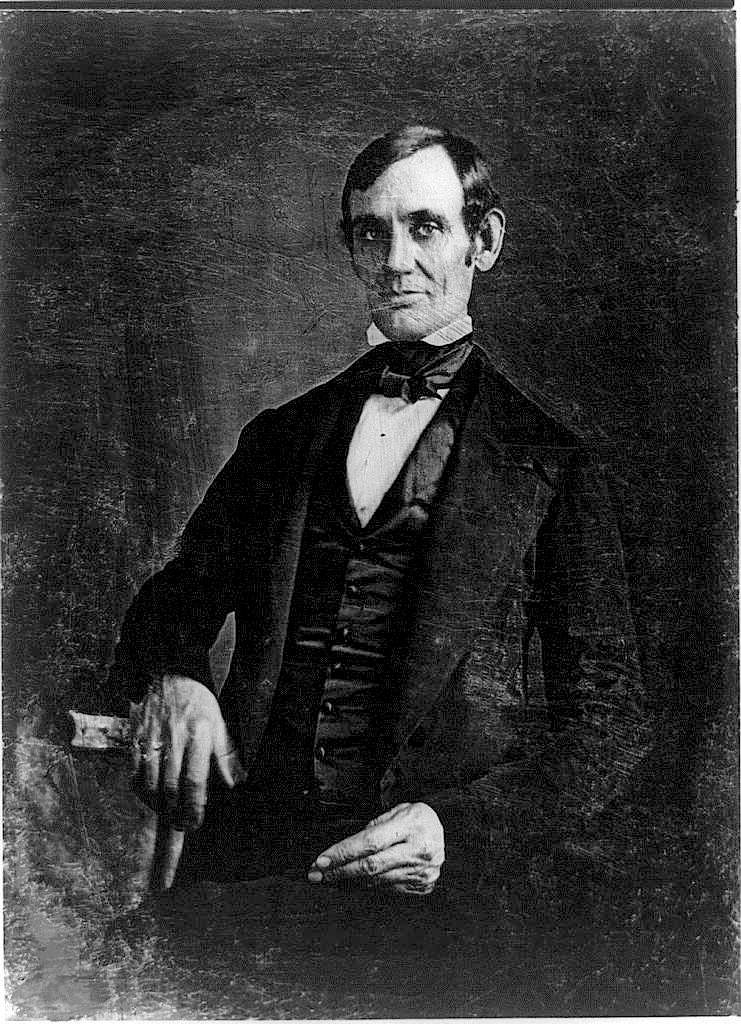
This image is the earliest known photograph of Abraham Lincoln and dates to around 1847, 15 years after the war.

Lincoln engaged in no combat during the Black Hawk War, as Lincoln's own recollections of this time attest. He did, however, see scalped corpses and witness the results of the war's atrocities. Lincoln was 23 years old at the time of the Black Hawk War, and his experience in the volunteer militia was his only military experience prior to becoming president.

Various sources, many compiled at the Abraham Lincoln Presidential Library and Museum, document the movements of Lincoln's company after the outbreak of hostilities at the Battle of Stillman's Run. On May 15, 1832, Lincoln's company set out under the command of Whiteside and reached the site of Stillman's Run by sunset. According to letters from Whiteside to militia commander Henry Atkinson, the soldiers, including Lincoln, arrived to find militia men dead, scalped, and mangled.

In a 2006 article, author Scott Dyer asserted that Whiteside's men, including Captain Lincoln, "paraded" the area the morning after, and buried the dead from Stillman's Run. Their movements were in an unsuccessful effort to draw out the Sauk, after which they returned to Dixon's Ferry. Lincoln's presence at Stillman's Run was still under investigation as of 2003.

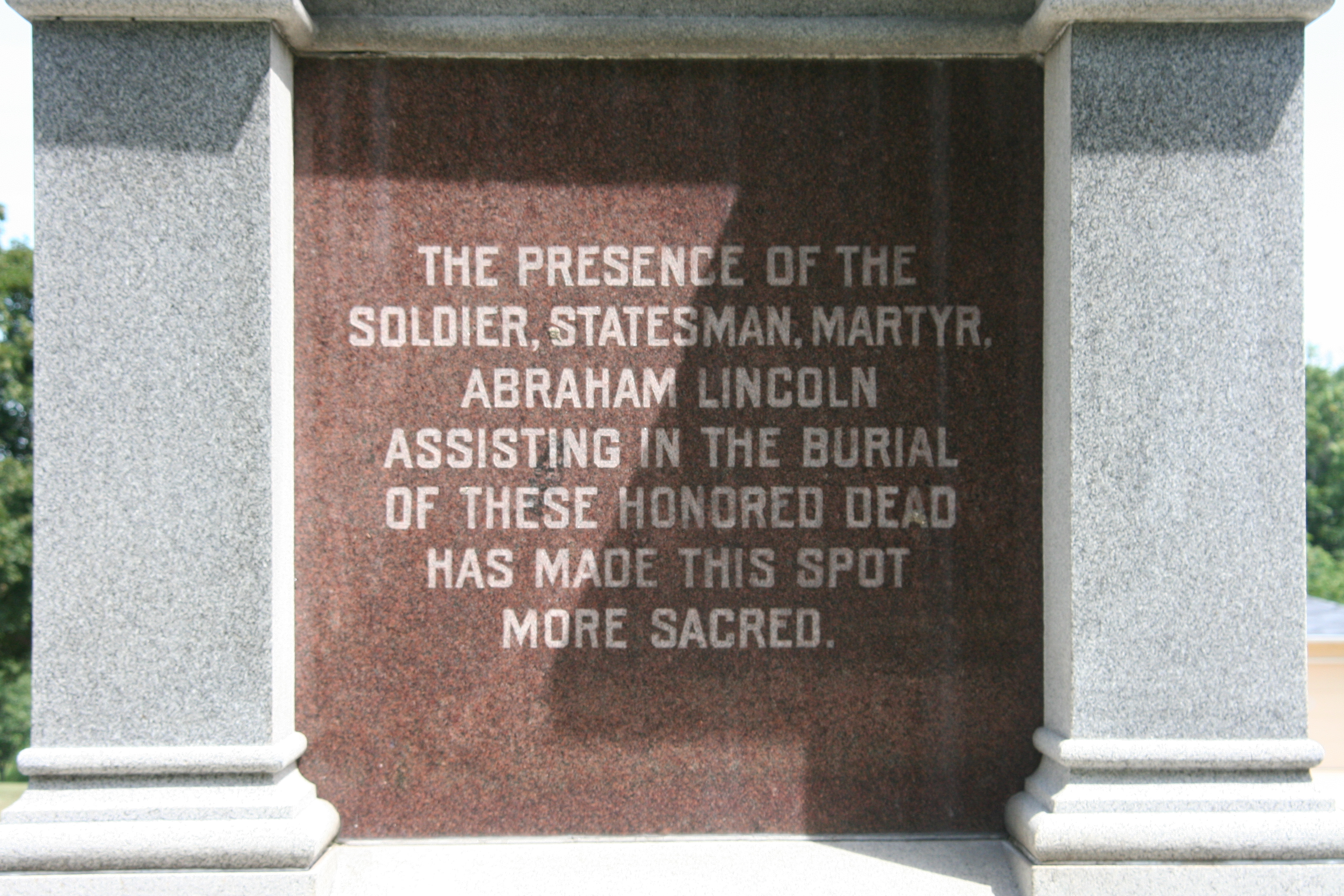
An inscription on the monument in Stillman Valley concerning Lincoln's role in the aftermath of the battle.

The marble facade on the Stillman Valley monument, erected in 1901, commemorating the battle, includes the reference to Lincoln's presence at Stillman's Run, "The presence of soldier, statesman, martyr, Abraham Lincoln assisting in the burial of these honored dead has made this spot more sacred."

Still, other sources assert that it was General Whiteside who originally buried the dead in a common grave on a ridge south of the battlefield, marked with a rudimentary wooden memorial. These sources make no mention of Lincoln.

=== From captain to private ===
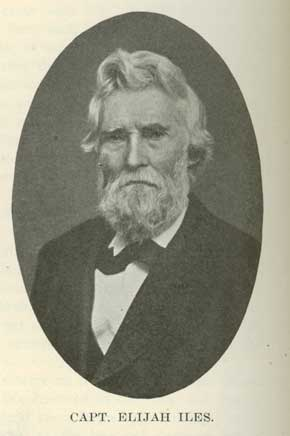
When Lincoln was mustered out of command on May 27 he re-enlisted and was reduced in rank to private under the command of Captain Elijah Iles.

Two days after Stillman's Run, Lincoln and his company drew 10 quarts of meal and 10 pounds of pork from supply at Dixon's Ferry, Illinois. After a 20-mile (32 km) march on May 25, Lincoln's company camped near Paw Paw Grove. The next day, Lincoln and his company marched another 20 miles (32 km) and camped two miles (3 km) above the mouth of the Fox River. On May 27, Lincoln's company was mustered out of service. Lincoln was discharged from his command, and he re-enlisted as a private in the company of Captain Elijah Iles in Ottawa, Illinois.

Henry Atkinson, a militia commander, arrived in Ottawa on May 28, and on May 29 Lieutenant Robert Anderson formally mustered Lincoln and a hodgepodge of 71 other former officers into a company of mounted volunteers under Iles. Atkinson left and met with Governor Reynolds; Atkinson then returned to Ottawa on May 30 and decided not to pursue Black Hawk until further militia reinforcements arrived on June 15. On June 6, 1832, Captain Iles' company, including Lincoln, began the march to Dixon's Ferry; they arrived during the afternoon of June 7.

From June 8 to June 10, the company moved on orders toward Galena; on June 8, the group camped 20 miles (32 km) from Dixon's Ferry, and on June 9 near the Apple River Fort. The company found the people in Galena demoralized and was ordered to return to Dixon's Ferry on June 11. On the march back, the group made camp at the same campsites it used on its march toward Galena. The men arrived back in Dixon's Ferry on June 13, and on June 16, Anderson mustered them out of service at Fort Wilbourn.

From June 16 until July 10, Lincoln served as a private in Captain Jacob Early's independent company. Early's company was known as an "independent spy company", which was ordered into federal service by Atkinson and meant to operate separately from the other brigades.

Later, Lincoln told William Herndon, "I was out of work and there being no danger of more fighting, I could do nothing better than enlist again." Early's company was officially mustered into service on June 20, and two days later it was ordered to report to General Hugh Brady at Dixon's Ferry. The company remained at Dixon's Ferry through June 25, 1832. Early's company was then dispatched to Kellogg's Grove at 4 p.m. on June 25.

=== Kellogg's Grove ===
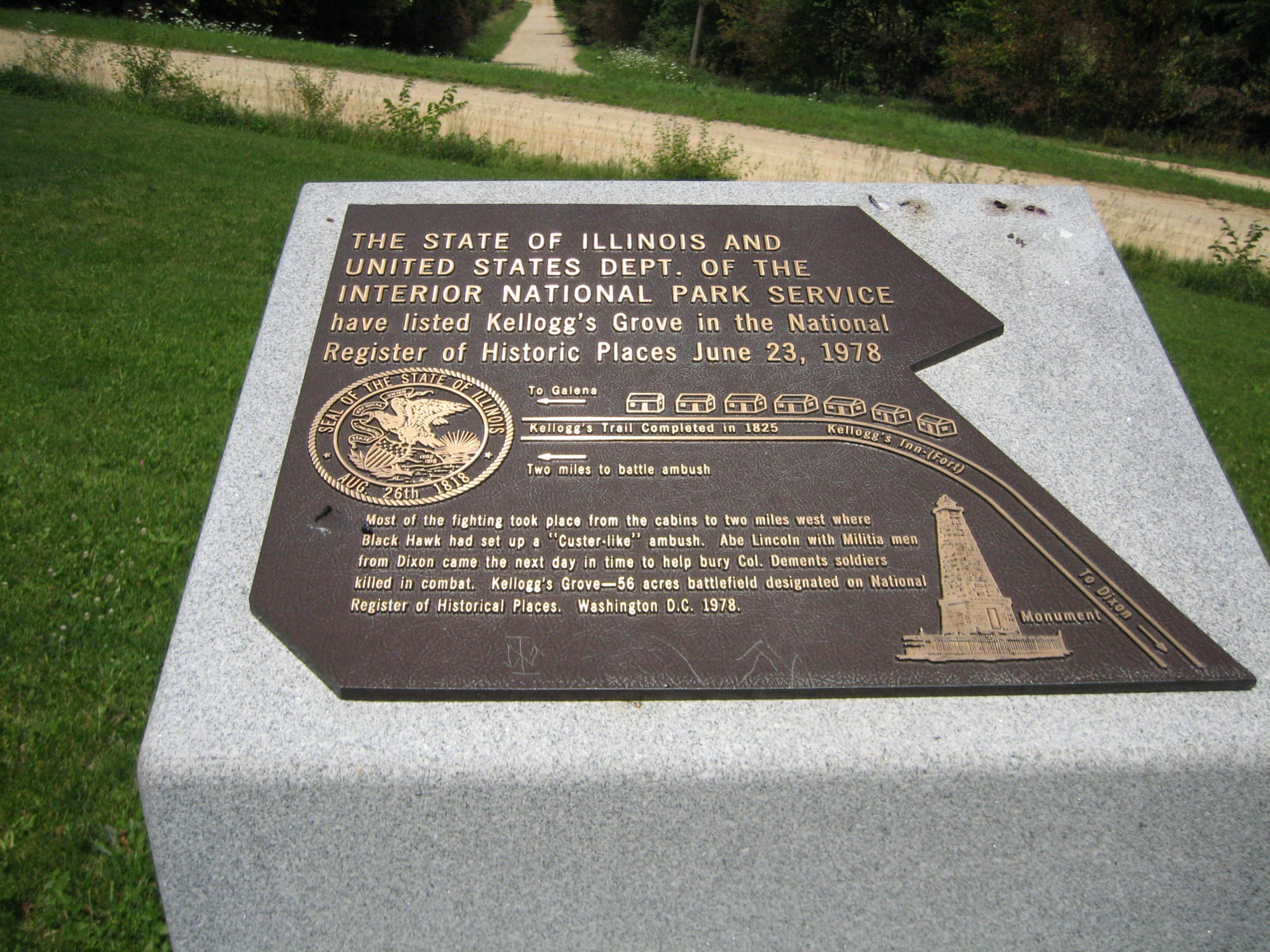
The plaque at the site of the Battle of Kellogg's Grove mentions Lincoln's presence there

A number of sources assert that on June 26, 1832, the morning after the Second Battle of Kellogg's Grove, members of Early's company arrived at Kellogg's Grove to help bury the dead. Lincoln assisted with the burial, and later made a statement about his experience connected with the battles of both Kellogg's Grove and Stillman's Run.

I remember just how those men looked as we rode up the little hill where their camp was. The red light of the morning sun was streaming upon them as they lay head towards us on the ground. And every man had a round red spot on top of his head, about as big as a dollar where the redskins had taken his scalp. It was frightful, but it was grotesque, and the red sunlight seemed to paint everything all over. I remember one man had on buckskin breeches.

The Lincoln quote appeared both in William H. Herndon and Jesse W. Wiek's Life of Lincoln and in Carl Sandburg's Lincoln biography, Abraham Lincoln: The Prairie Years. Documentation for the U.S. National Register of Historic Places listing for Kellogg's Grove cites Lincoln's presence as part of its historic significance.

The same day, on June 16, Captain Early wrote to General Atkinson, describing the situation in his own words.

I arrived here by day brake this morning [26th] & found Gen. Posey's men encamped here The circumstances connected with the attack on Maj. Dement's Bat[talion].are as well as I can gather substantially these Yesterday morning the Maj. ordered out a small party for the purpose of examining a trail leading to the Mississippi The detachment had not proceeded more than half a mile when they discovered a few Indians at a small distance from them the men rushed on them in a disorderly manner till they came to the main body of Indians where they were secreted in a thicket on seeing the Indians the men wheeled & fled precipitately & all the efforts of Maj. Dement to rally them were unavailing (for at the time the men commenced retreating before the Indians Maj. Dement came up with a reinforcement from the garrison The Maj. stated to me that his force on the field was equal in numbers to that of the enemy After the men retreated to the fort the Indians surrounded the house & commenced killing the Horses, they kept up a constant fire on the House & Horses for 2 or 3 hours. Major Dement Lost 5 killed & several wounded but none mortally when the Indians left the ground they retreated toward their encampment on the 4 lakes

When Gen Posey came up about an hour by sun he sent a regiment in the direction in which the Indians had retired. When they had proceeded about ½ mile the Indians showed themselves from a thick wood which skirted the praeria ... they [regiment] retired to their camps without engaging the enemy. The trail spoken of above has not yet been examined. Gen Posey says he will send a detachment with me to examine it. As soon as I see it you shall have the best information in my power to give you.

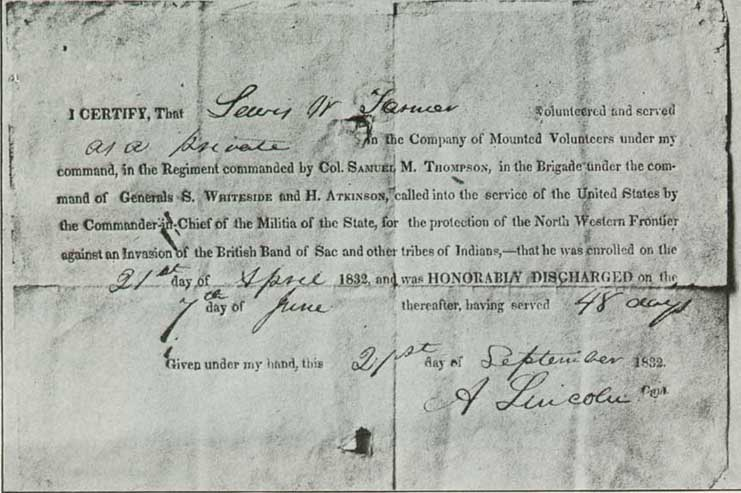
An honorable discharge signed by Lincoln for a private under his command.

Early's company, including Lincoln, remained at Kellogg's Grove until June 28, when they began their march back to Dixon's Ferry. They arrived sometime around 6 a.m. on June 29.

=== Mustered out ===
On July 10, 1832, Atkinson decided he had too many men and mustered Early's company, including Lincoln, out of service. Lincoln's military career ended less than three months after it began. In his last duty as a soldier, Lincoln wrote out the company roll for Lieutenant Robert Anderson, the man who had mustered him into service in his second company under Iles.

Lincoln's horse, along with a comrade's, was stolen the night before he was discharged from service; thus they made their way back to New Salem mostly on foot and occasionally on another comrade's horse. Once in Peoria, Lincoln and his wartime compatriot bought a canoe and made their way down the Illinois River to Havana. At Havana, they disembarked and made the final 23-mile (37 km) jaunt on foot.

== Lincoln's military ability ==
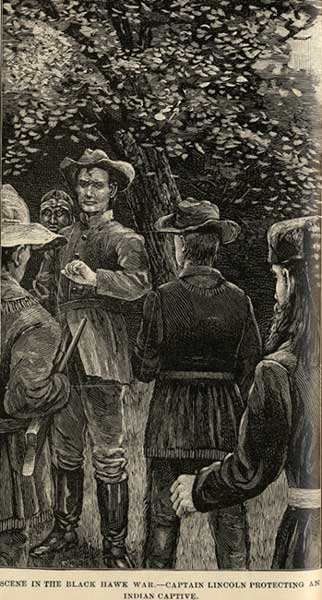
Lincoln depicted protecting a Native American from his own men in a scene often related about Lincoln's war-time service

Lincoln had no military experience when he was elected captain of his company, but a large number of sources have described him as a capable commander and a popular leader. Lincoln himself expressed a desire to get into combat, though his company has been described as wild and the outcome of such a fight may not have been positive for Lincoln. John Todd Stuart noted that during Lincoln's Black Hawk War service, he stood out for his great strength and athletic ability, as well as his kind manner and as a story teller.

One popularly repeated story from Lincoln's Black Hawk War service illustrates Lincoln's qualities of honesty, and courageous, competent leadership. It involves a Potawotami who wandered into Captain Lincoln's camp. Lincoln's men assumed him a spy and wanted to kill him. The story goes that Lincoln threw himself between the Native American and the men's muskets, knocking their weapons upward and protecting the Potawotami. The militia men backed down after a few heated seconds.

Another popularly repeated story about Lincoln's leadership during the war illustrates his inexperience as a military commander. The story goes that Lincoln was marching his company and encountered an open gate, through which his formation needed to pass. Unable to remember the proper command to direct his men through the gate, Lincoln called "Halt!" and ordered the men to fall out for two minutes and then reform on the other side of the gate.

Other negative accounts of Lincoln's ability as a military leader came in the 1870s, when J. F. Snyder interviewed several of Lincoln's men from the Black Hawk War days. Snyder claimed the men, "never spoke of malice of Lincoln but always in a spirit of ridicule" and that they characterized Lincoln as "indolent and vulgar", "a joke, an absurdity", and the men "had serious doubts about his courage".

== Legacy and influence on Lincoln ==
On April 16, 1852, by act of Congress from 1850, Lincoln received a 40-acre (160,000 m^{2}) land-grant in Iowa for his service during the Black Hawk War. Soldiers in the Indian Wars often received land grants in exchange for their service. Lincoln received 160 acres (0.65 km^{2}) in total, with the other 120 acres (0.49 km^{2}) given to him in 1856. Besides the tangible rewards, Lincoln's service during the war helped him cultivate political connections throughout Illinois. David Herbert Donald stated in his 1996 work Lincoln:

Meeting volunteers from different parts of the state was useful to him politically, for it extended his reputation. While he was in the army, he came into contact with a number of rising young political leaders of the state, like Orville Hickman Browning, a cautious, conservative Quincy lawyer, who would become one of his most influential and critical friends. More important was his acquaintance with John Todd Stuart, a Springfield lawyer, who served as major in the same battalion as Lincoln.

Later, in 1859, Lincoln referred to his wartime service fondly, noting his election as captain as one of the proudest moments in his life. His Black Hawk War service has been referred to as a "shaping circumstance in his life", as well as something he later referred to with modesty and self-depreciation. Lincoln made one tongue-in-cheek remark concerning his wartime service in a speech during the presidential campaign of 1848 to the U.S. House of Representatives, where he referenced his service in the Black Hawk War, mentioning the Battle of Stillman's Run by name and jokingly referred to his limited military service to satirize the military hero image of that year’s Democratic Party presidential nominee Lewis Cass.

By the way Mr. Speaker, did you know that I am a military hero? Yes sir, in the days of the Black Hawk War I fought, bled and came away ... I was not at Stillman's defeat, but I was about as near it as Cass was Hull's surrender, and, like him, I saw the place very soon afterwards ... If he saw any live, fighting Indians, it was more than I did; but I had a good many bloody struggles with the mosquitoes, and although I never fainted from the loss of blood, I can truly say I was often very hungry.

Some have regarded Lincoln's brief stint in the militia as important to his presidential leadership later on, during the American Civil War. The 2002 essay collection, Rediscovering Abraham Lincoln, described Lincoln's familiarity with military affairs during the Civil War as "alien", noting that he regarded his own military service as a subject suited to mockery.

While he was campaigning for president, the story of how Lincoln stopped his men from killing the Potawatomi they encountered before the outbreak of the war made its way into a campaign biography. Reporting by The New York Times during the campaign of 1860 noted Lincoln's war time service as a captain. The same article implies that his bravery during the Black Hawk War may have led to his post-war appointment as postmaster in New Salem. Following Lincoln's assassination, Ralph Waldo Emerson gave a speech in Concord, Massachusetts, which highlighted Lincoln's Black Hawk War service.

== See also ==
- Early life and career of Abraham Lincoln
