= John Giles Adams =

American officer (1792–1832)

- Born: December 2, 1792 near Nashville, Tennessee
- Died: May 14, 1832 (aged 39) present-day Stillman Valley, Illinois
- Military career
- Allegiance: United States of America
- Branch: Illinois Militia
- Service years: 1832
- Rank: Captain
- Units: 5th Regiment, Brigade of Mounted Volunteers
- Commands: Tazewell County, Illinois company
- Conflicts: Black Hawk War: Battle of Stillman's Run

John Giles Adams (December 2, 1792 – May 14, 1832) was a cavalry officer in the Illinois Militia during the Black Hawk War of 1832. He was born in Nashville, Tennessee and came to Illinois in 1828, eventually marrying and fathering eight children. Adams served as captain in a militia company of more than 50 mounted volunteers who were mustered into service on April 17, 1832 following the onset of the war. Adams' company saw action in the disastrous militia defeat at Stillman's Run on May 14. Adams and several members of his company were killed while making a stand upon a hillside near the main militia camp.

== Early life ==
John Giles Adams was born in or near Nashville, Tennessee on December 2, 1792. He came to Illinois in 1828 via oxen team and built a log cabin near Atlanta, Illinois. He eventually married and had four sons and four daughters, who were left in their mother's care upon his death. Prior to the outbreak of the Black Hawk War, Adams made his residence in Pekin.

== Militia service ==
John G. Adams was captain of a company that included 59 other "mounted volunteers" from Pekin. The company was mustered into service for the Black Hawk War on April 17, 1832. Adams' group was part of the 5th Regiment commanded by Colonel James Johnson, which was in turn under the auspices of the Brigade of Mounted Volunteers and Brigadier General Samuel Whiteside. Including Adams, the company suffered four killed in action during the Battle of Stillman's Run on May 14, 1832; two other members of the company deserted two days after Stillman's Run. The battle was the first engagement of the 1832 Black Hawk War, and resulted in an embarrassing defeat for the Illinois Militia under Major Isaiah Stillman. The rest of the Adams' company was released from service on May 17, 1832.

== Death ==
Captain Adams left Dixon's Ferry for Old Man's Creek, in command of his company, early on May 13, 1832. He was under the command of Major David Bailey, who was accompanied by two other companies. In addition, they were with Major Isaiah Stillman's three company command. The total militia force leaving Dixon's Ferry was around 275.

During an important moment in the disorganized battle at Stillman's Run, while much of the rest of the force fled in terror, Adams compiled a rear-guard element and took a position on a slight hill south of the main militia camp. Frank Stevens described Adams' death in his 1903 book The Black Hawk War:

As the troops came headlong on, Captain Adams, than whom [sic] no braver man ever lived, attempted to make a stand with a handful of companions upon the brow of the hill which lies about half a mile to the south of the creek, to cover the retreat of the fugitives. Darkness was upon them and they had no reason to believe that less than the full force of 800 was upon them, yet they stood their ground to sell their lives as dearly as possible to save those who by the delay might reach points of safety. The moonlight was only sufficient to confuse the panic-stricken troops still more, and in that heroic fight unto death which Captain Adams and his men made, he scarcely knew whether he was fighting friend or foe. In the gloaming the conflict went on, and in the darkness of the night, while the scattering forces were safely fleeing on to Dixon's Ferry, Captain Adams and his little band fell one by one, until the last man bit the dust, and then a scene of malignant deviltry almost incredible was perpetrated. -Stevens, 1903

The Hon. John A. Atwood declared at a 1904 meeting of the Ogle County Old Settlers' Association that Adams' bravery was comparable to that of George Armstrong Custer at Little Big Horn. At least one writer, however, has asserted that Adams' death was at the hands of his own men as he tried to organize them for battle. Adams' wife died in 1871 and all eight of his children were dead by 1899.
