= David Bailey (militia officer) =

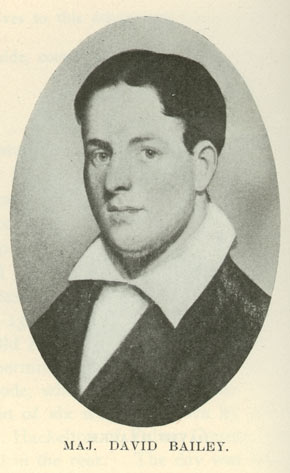
David Bailey in an undated portrait.

David Bailey (1801–1854) was an American militia officer and abolitionist in the Illinois Militia who was a key participant in the Black Hawk War. Most notably, he served at the Battle of Stillman's Run, where he and Lt. Col. Major Isaiah Stillman were defeated by Black Hawk's British Band at Stillman Creek in present-day Ogle County, Illinois, on May 14, 1832.

In addition, Bailey was the defendant in an emancipation legal case defended by Abraham Lincoln entitled Bailey vs. Cromwell. This 1841 Illinois Supreme Court case was Lincoln's first recorded emancipation case.

== Biography ==
David Bailey was a native of Hillsboro, New Hampshire, born there on June 12, 1801. He was the next to youngest son of Joseph Bailey. David Bailey cane to Pekin, Illinois, when in his eighteenth year, and was engaged as a merchant in this place on the outbreak of the Black Hawk War. He then entered the service as a captain of militia, and was soon promoted to major, and afterward colonel of his regiment, having charge of the army stationed at Ft. Dearborn. While there he met and afterward married Miss Sarah Ann Brown, who was born in Connecticut May 25, 1811; she was the daughter of Rufus Brown, one of the earliest settlers of the city of Chicago.

== Black Hawk War ==
Joining the 5th Regiment as a major in early 1832, he was given independent command of a battalion of mounted Illinois Volunteers. With a combined force of 341 men, of which Bailey commanded three companies of 197 soldiers, he and Lt. Col. Major Isaiah Stillman were ordered by Governor John Reynolds to guard the settled areas of the Mississippi and Illinois rivers after receiving reports of Black Hawk moving in to threaten the frontier.

On May 12, while staying at Dixon's Ferry, he and Stillman encountered Brigadier General Samuel Whiteside and Governor Reynolds, having been en route to Black Hawk's camp by way of the village of the Winnebago Prophet. Despite objections by Whiteside, he and Stillman were directed by Reynolds to "coerce" Black Hawk's British Band, then camped at Old Man's Creek, to surrender. Proceeding up the Rock River with Stillman's troops, they set up camp two days later near Old Man's Creek (near present-day Stillman Valley, Illinois) unaware that they were only 7 miles (11 km) south of the Sauk encampment.

Through the local Potawatomi, Black Hawk was told of the presence of the Illinois Militia and sent three messengers to the militia camp under a white flag in order to negotiate a peace with Stillman and Bailey. Upon encountering the three messengers, they were brought back to the militia encampment. As there was no Sac interpreter available, progress was slow in discussing surrender terms. During the proceedings, fighting broke out when militiamen shot at scouts seen on the hillside, resulting in the death of one of the emissaries and a militia flagbearer, while the other two messengers escaped to report back to Black Hawk.

During the subsequent battle against Black Hawk's forces, Bailey and Stillman's disorganized militia were ambushed and thrown into retreat. In an attempt to cover their retreat, 12 militiamen under Captain John Giles Adams fought to the death while holding off their Sauk pursuers on a hill south of the militia camp.

The presence of Bailey during the battle is unclear, although it is presumed he had some role in directing the 30-mile (48 km) retreat back to rejoin the main force at Dixon's Ferry, as he and Stillman survived to make their report. As the main force left to follow Black Hawk up the Kishwaukee River, Bailey and Stillman were left to guard the supplies and the wounded at Dixon's Ferry; however, what remained of their command left for their homes soon after General Henry Atkinson and Brigadier General Whiteside left camp.

Although held responsible for the defeat, it is accepted by many historians that both Bailey and Stillman may have been unfairly blamed for the disastrous battle which was due more to the unclear orders given by Governor John Reynolds, whose actions may have been politically motivated.

== Bailey vs Cromwell ==
"In 1841, Lincoln defended Major David Bailey, a friend with whom Lincoln had served in the Black Hawk War. Bailey was being sued by the estate of Dr. William Cromwell for refusing to pay to Cromwell's estate four hundred dollars for an 'indentured servant', Nance Legins-Costley. In 1836, when he was moving to Texas, Cromwell had arranged to have Bailey purchase the unwed and pregnant Nance. In exchange, Bailey, an abolitionist, signed a promissory note agreeing to pay Cromwell four hundred dollars when he received legal proof of Nance's indentured status. Lincoln won that case on the basis that involuntary servitude was illegal in Illinois and that Cromwell's case could not produce the record of the woman's voluntary indentured status. Nance was free."
