= Stillman's Run Battle Site =

- U.S. National Register of Historic Places
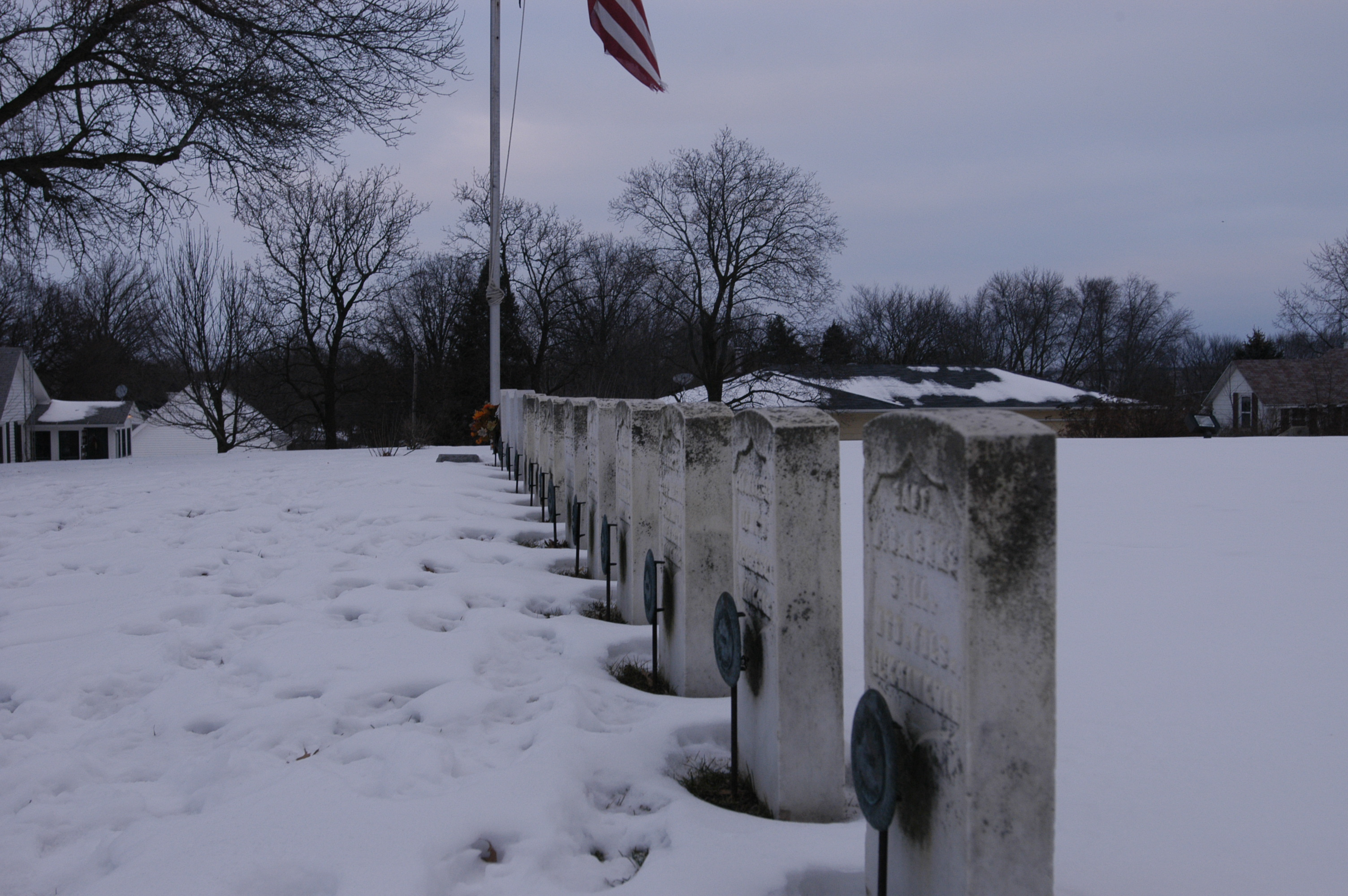
- The tombstones of the fallen are part of the memorial at the site of the Battle of Stillman's Run.

- Location within Illinois Location within the United States
- Location: Roosevelt and Spruce Sts., Stillman Valley, Illinois
- Coordinates: 42°6′21″N 89°10′48″W
- Area: less than one acre
- Built: 1901
- Architect: Creo and Creo, J. H. Anderson
- NRHP reference No.: 83003587
- Added to NRHP: December 8, 1983

Stillman's Run Battle Site is a site in Stillman Valley, Illinois. It is listed on the National Register of Historic Places and has been since December 1983. The Battle of Stillman's Run was an 1832 clash between the Illinois militia and Black Hawk and his Sauk Indian Band. The battle took place in 1832 as part of the Black Hawk War. During the engagement 12 militia men were killed while making a stand on a small hill. The rest of the militia fled back to Dixon's Ferry where they spread news of a terrible slaughter at Stillman's Run.

== History ==
The Battle of Stillman's Run occurred on May 14, 1832. The battle was named for Major Isaiah Stillman and his detachment of 275 Illinois militia which fled in a panic from a large number of Sauk warriors. According to witness statements, the militia may have been outnumbered two to one. The engagement was the first battle of the 1832 Black Hawk War which had ignited after Black Hawk crossed the Mississippi River into Illinois with his "British Band" of Sauk and Meskwaki. During the engagement 12 militia men were killed while making a stand on a small hill. The rest of the militia fled back to Dixon's Ferry where they spread news of a terrible slaughter at Stillman's Run. The number of Sauk and Meskwaki killed in the engagement is largely unknown. Black Hawk is quoted as saying at least three and maybe as many as five of his warriors were killed.

== Monument ==
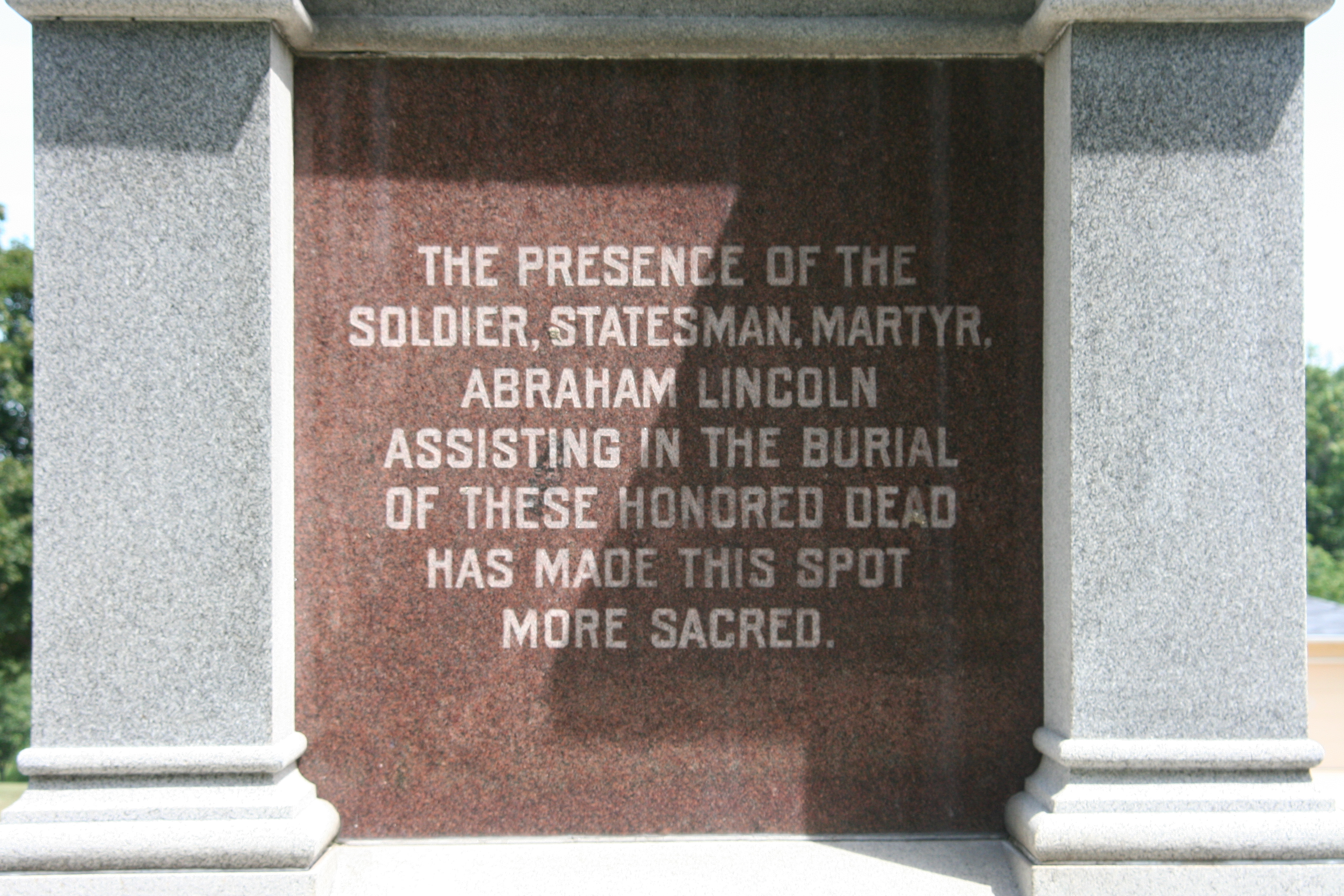
One inscription on the monument notes Abraham's Lincoln's presence at the battle site.

A marble and granite monument stands at the site of the Battle of Stillman's Run today. It was designed and constructed by Creo and Creo, and J.H. Anderson. The monument was erected by the Battlefield Memorial Association of Stillman Valley in 1901. It was built using funds from the state of Illinois, appropriated during the 42nd General Assembly. The site of the monument is less than one acre and currently functions as a small park.

The polished marble monument has several inscriptions on it. On one side of the monument an inscription notes:

In memory of the Illinois volunteers who fell at Stillman's Run, May 14, 1832, in an engagement with Black Hawk and his warriors."

one inscription on the monument reads:

The presence of soldier, statesman, martyr, Abraham Lincoln assisting in the burial of these honored dead has made this spot more sacred."

a historical marker at the site reads:

Here, on May 14, 1832, the first engagement of the Black Hawk War took place. When 275 Illinois militiamen under Maj. Isaiah Stillman were put to flight by Black Hawk and his warriers. So thoroughly demoralized were the volunteers that a new army had to be called into the field."

Another inscription on the monument denotes that it was erected by the Battlefield Memorial Association of Stillman Valley and it notes that the funding came from the Illinois General Assembly and was approved May 1, 1901. There is also a listing of the dead inscribed as well.

== Grave sites ==
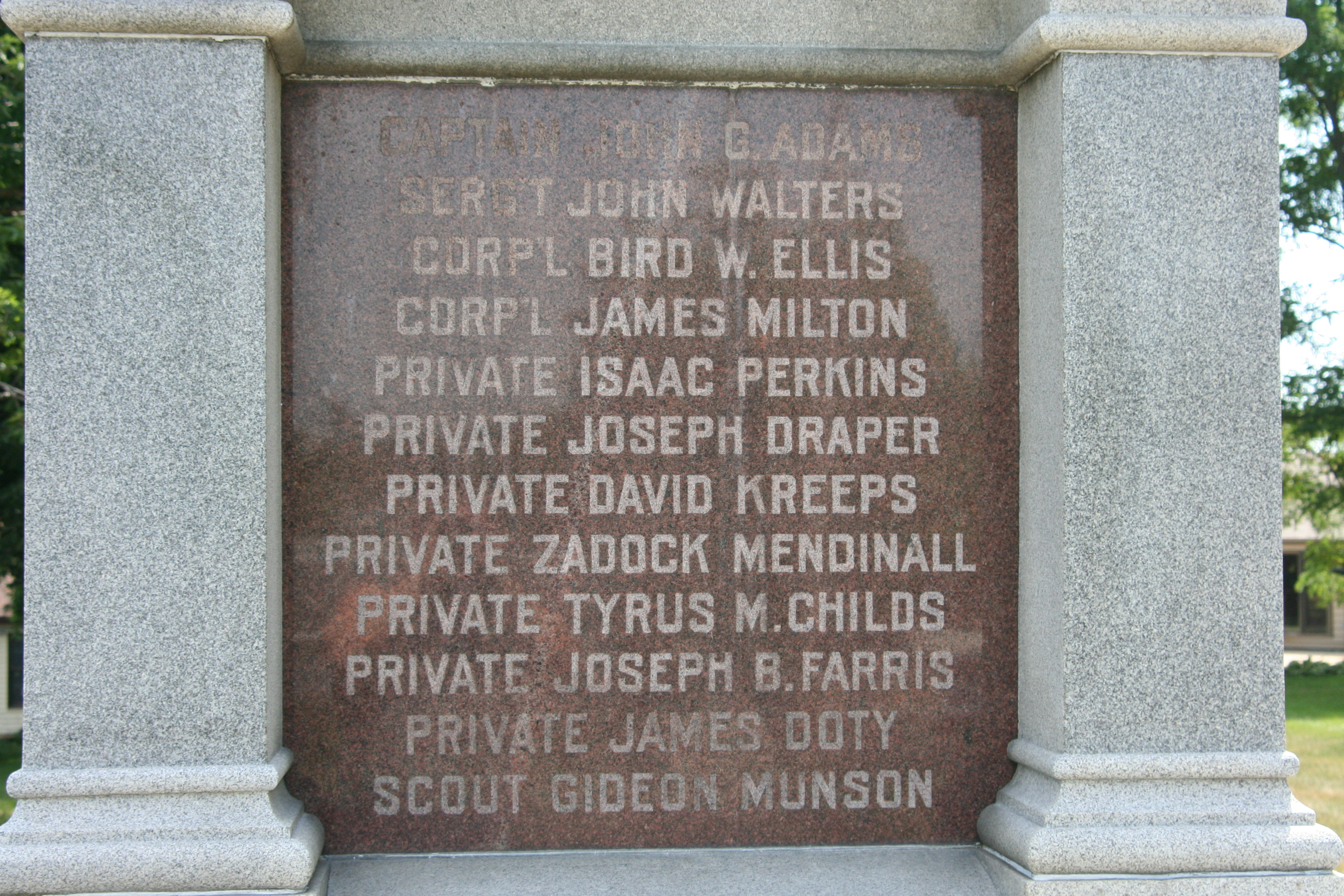
Another inscriptions lists the dead at Stillman's Run.

Listed casualties from monument (US Militia)
Captain John Giles Adams
Sergt John Walters
Corp'l Bird W. Ellis
Corp'l James Milton
Private Isaac Perkins
Private Joseph Draper
Private David Kreeps
Private Zadock Mendinall
Private Tyrus M. Childs
Private Joseph B. Farris
Private James Doty
Scout Gideon Munson

== Significance ==
The Stillman's Run Battle Site was listed on the National Register of Historic Places on December 8, 1983 for its significance in military history.
