= Henry Andrus =

American politician (1844–1935)

Member of the Illinois Senate from the 10th district
- In office 1908 – 1916
- Preceded by: Andrew J. Anderson
- In office 1900 – 1904
- Preceded by: Delos W. Baxter
- Succeeded by: Andrew J. Anderson

Member of the Illinois House of Representatives
- In office 1896 – 1900
- Preceded by: C. Henry Woolsey

Personal details
- Born: November 4, 1844 Harlem Township, Winnebago County, Illinois
- Died: January 29, 1935 (aged 90)
- Party: Republican
- Profession: Farmer

Henry Andrus (November 4, 1844 – February 2, 1935) was an American politician from Illinois. Born and raised in Winnebago County, Illinois, Andrus spent his whole life in the county. He originally helped on his family's farm, then started his own. The success of the farm led to his election to the county board of supervisors. In 1896, he was elected to the Illinois House of Representatives, then continued to the Illinois Senate. He served in the upper house from 1900 to 1904, then again from 1908 to 1916.

== Biography ==
Henry Andrus was born in Harlem Township, Winnebago County, Illinois, on November 4, 1844. He attended public schools and assisted on the family farm. He continued to work the farm through his early adulthood until he was twenty-one, when he moved to Pecatonica, Illinois. Six years later, he moved on to a farm in Cherry Valley Township. His farm became very successful and Andrus became a leading citizen of the county. He was elected a township supervisor, holding the role for nineteen years. For seven of these years, he was chairman of the Winnebago County Board of Supervisors.

In 1896, Andrus was elected to the Illinois House of Representatives as a Republican. He was re-elected two years later and then was elected to the Illinois Senate in 1900. He served in the upper house through 1904. During his first legislative tenure, he pushed for the passage of an act for the board of supervisors to appropriate funds to build Memorial Hall in Rockford. He also advocated for an act establishing a monument at the Stillman's Run Battle Site in Stillman Valley. The Republican Party did not support Andrus in 1904, instead running Andrew J. Anderson as their candidate. Andrus returned to the state senate in 1908, serving eight more years.

Andrus married Jennie Love in 1868. They had two surviving children (Edith and Sylvester Claude). Andrus was a member of the Benevolent and Protective Order of Elks, the Modern Woodmen of America, and was a 32nd degree Mason. He died at the home of his son after a three-week illness on February 2, 1935, and was buried in Cherry Valley Cemetery in Cherry Valley. John A. Atwood, who also served in the Illinois General Assembly, was the brother-in-law of Harry Andrus; Atwood's wife was the sister of Harry Andrus.
