= Harlem Township, Illinois =

Harlem Township may refer to one of the following places in the State of Illinois:

- Harlem Township, Stephenson County, Illinois
- Harlem Township, Winnebago County, Illinois

See also

- Harlem Township (disambiguation)
