= Senator Atwood =

Senator Atwood may refer to:

- John A. Atwood (1850–1930), Illinois State Senate
- Orville E. Atwood (1880–1939), Michigan State Senate
