= Senator Andrus =

Senator Andrus may refer to:

- Cecil Andrus (1931–2017), Idaho State Senate
- Henry Andrus (1844–1935), Illinois State Senate
- Wesley P. Andrus (1834–1898), Michigan State Senate
- William W. Andrus (1821–1910), Michigan State Senate
