= 105th Illinois Infantry Regiment =

105th Illinois Volunteer Infantry Regiment
- Active: 1862–1865
- Country: United States
- Allegiance: Union
- Branch: Union Army
- Type: Infantry
- Size: Regiment
- Facings: Light blue
- Engagements: American Civil War: Atlanta campaign; Battle of Resaca; Battle of Kennesaw Mountain; Battle of Peachtree Creek; Siege of Atlanta; Sherman's March to the Sea; Carolinas campaign; Battle of Bentonville

Commanders
- Commanding officer: Colonel Daniel Dustin

The 105th Illinois Infantry Regiment was an infantry regiment in the Union Army during the American Civil War. The regiment was made up of volunteers, primarily from the Illinois counties of DeKalb and DuPage but other counties were represented as well. The 105th Regiment served from 1862 through the end of the war in 1865.

== Origin ==
The 105th was formed in response to President Lincoln's July 1862 Proclamation 121 which requested 300,000 volunteers from throughout the Union to serve for three years.

The regiment consisted of ten companies of approximately 100 men each. Six of the companies were made up of men from DeKalb County and four companies came mostly from DuPage County. The regiment was mustered at Fort Dixon in Dixon, Illinois on September 2, 1862. It moved from Dixon to Camp Douglas in Chicago on September 8, 1862.

The regiment, commanded by Colonel Daniel Dustin, was initially attached to the Ward's Brigade commanded by General William T. Ward in the 12th Division in the Army of the Ohio.

== Organization ==
- Sept. 1862 - Nov. 1862: Ward's Brigade, Dumont's 12th Division, Army of the Ohio
- Nov. 1862 - June 1863: Ward's Brigade, Post of Gallatin, Tenn., Dept. of the Cumberland
- June 1863 - Oct. 1863: 2nd Brigade, 3rd Division, Reserve Corps, Dept. of the Cumberland
- Oct. 1863 - Jan. 1864: Ward's Brigade, Post of Nashville, Tenn., Dept. of the Cumberland
- Jan. 1864 - Apr. 1864: 1st Brigade, 1st Division, 11th Army Corps, Army of the Cumberland
- Apr. 1864 - June 1865: 1st Brigade, 3rd Division, 20th Army Corps, Army of the Cumberland, and Army of Georgia to June, 1865

== Officers and Staff ==
Colonel

- Daniel Dustin (Sept. 2,1862-June 7, 1865) Breveted Brig. Gen. Mar. 16,1865

Lieutenant Colonels

- Henry F. Vallette (Sept. 2,1862-June 18, 1864)
- Everell F. Dutton (June 18, 1864 – June 7, 1865)

Majors

- Everell F. Dutton (Sept. 22,1862-June 18, 1864)
- Henry D. Brown (June 18, 1864 – June 7, 1865)

Adjutants

- William N. Phillips (Sept. 2,1862-Dec.2, 1862)
- David D. Chandler (Dec.2, 1862-June 7, 1865)

Quartermaster

- Timothy Wells (Sept. 2,1862-June 7, 1865)

Surgeons

- Horace S. Potter (Sept. 5,1862-June 2, 1864)
- Alfred Waterman (June 2, 1864 – June 7, 1865)

First Ass't Surgeons

- Alfred Waterman (Sept. 2,1862-June 2, 1864)
- George W. Beggs (June 2, 1864 – June 7, 1865)

Second Ass't Surgeon

- George W. Beggs (Sept. 2,1862-June 2, 1864)

Chaplains.

- Levi P. Crawford (Sept. 15, 1862-Dec. 24, 1862)
- Daniel Chapman (Dec. 24, 1862-June 7, 1865)

== Service ==
The 105th Illinois Infantry was organized at Dixon, Illinois, and mustered in for three years of service on September 2, 1862, under the command of Colonel Daniel Dustin. It was recruited in DeKalb and DuPage counties.

The regiment was attached to Ward's Brigade, Dumont's 12th Division, Army of the Ohio, to November 1862. Ward's Brigade, Post of Gallatin, Tennessee, Department of the Cumberland, to June 1863. 2nd Brigade, 3rd Division, Reserve Corps, Department of the Cumberland, to August 1863. Ward's Brigade, Post of Nashville, Tennessee, Department of the Cumberland, to January 1864. 1st Brigade, 1st Division, XI Corps, Army of the Cumberland, to April 1864. 1st Brigade, 3rd Division, XX Corps, Army of the Cumberland and Army of Georgia to June 1865.

The 105th Illinois Infantry mustered out of service on June 7, 1865, and discharged at Chicago, Illinois, on July 17, 1865.

== Casualties ==
When the 105th left Camp Douglas to begin serving in the field on September 30, 1862, a total of 967 men had been mustered in. By that time, 8 men had either resigned, been discharged or transferred to another unit within the Union military forces. In addition one man had died and 8 men deserted, leaving an active population of 950 men in the regiment.

By the time the 105th completed its service on June 7, 1865, 1012 men had mustered into the regiment and 512 mustered out. One hundred and sixty eight men lost their lives, Two hundred and eighty four men were either discharged, resigned, or transferred to other organizations within the Union military. Thirty six men had deserted. Of the 954 men who mustered in at the regiment's inception on September 2, 1862, 496 mustered out.

== See also ==
- List of Illinois Civil War units

== Sources ==
- Dyer, Frederick H. (1908). "A Compendium of the War of the Rebellion: 105th Illinois Infantry Regiment". Internet Archive. Des Moines, Iowa: Dyer Publishing Co. pp. 1091–1092.
- Reece, J.N. (1901). "Report of the Adjutant General of the State of Illinois: 1861-1866 - Volume V". Internet Archive. Springfield, Illinois: Phillips Bros., State Printers. p. 686.
- "105th Regiment, Illinois Infantry". National Park Service.
