= Battle of Kellogg's Grove =

1832, Black Hawk War, Illinois

Coordinates: 42°17′45″N 89°52′53″W

- Part of the Black Hawk War
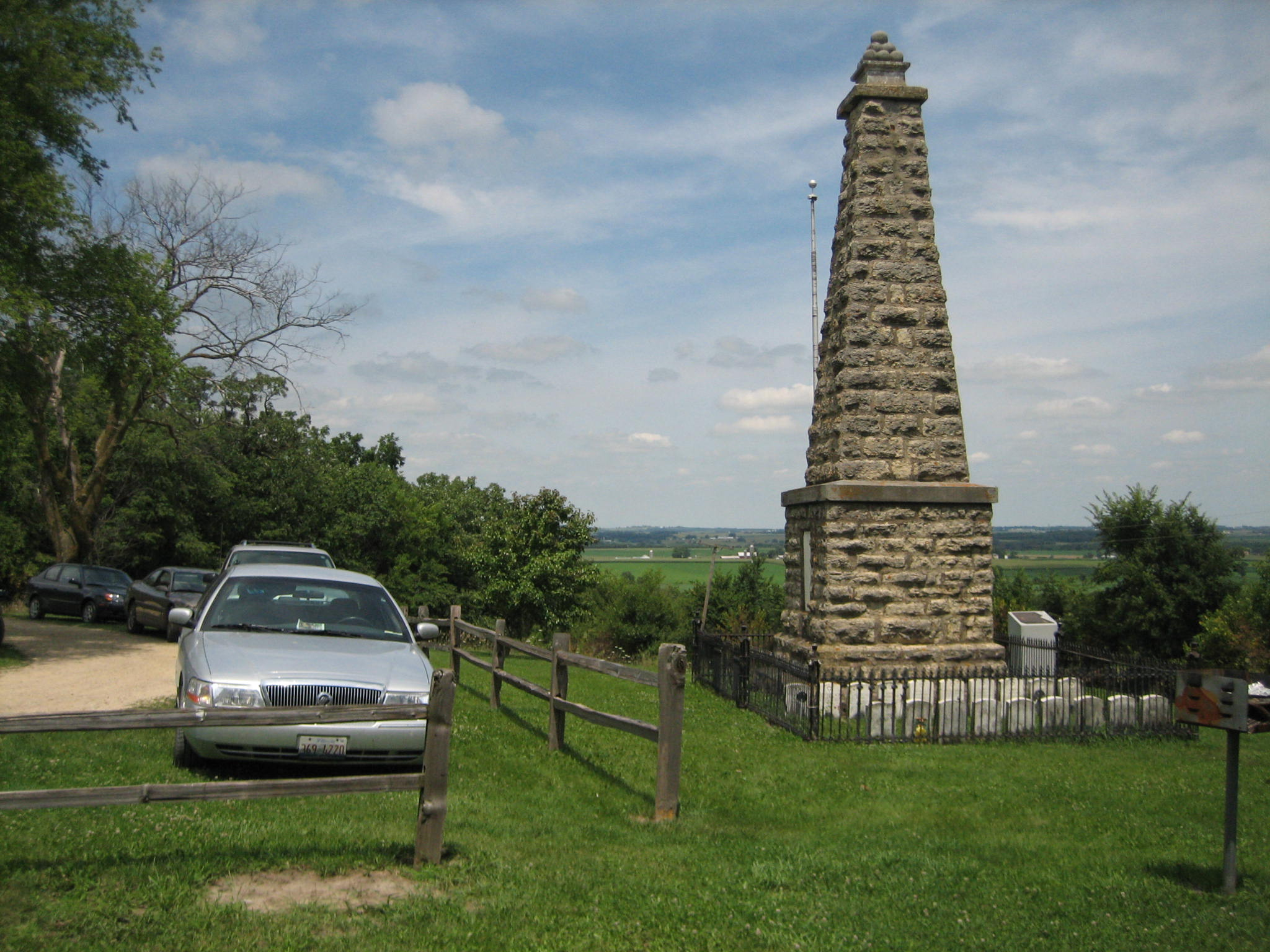
- Monument and graves located in a park near Kent, Illinois.
Date	June 16 and June 25, 1832
Location	Near Kent, Illinois
Result	Disputed

Belligerents
United States	Sauk; Meskwaki; Kickapoo

Commanders and leaders
John Dement; Adam W. Snyder; Samuel Whiteside	Black Hawk

Strength
approximately 300	80

Casualties and losses
8 KIA; 3 WIA	at least 15 KIA

The Battle of Kellogg's Grove is either of two minor battles, or skirmishes, fought during the Black Hawk War in the U.S. state of Illinois, in present-day Stephenson County at and near Kellogg's Grove. In the first skirmish, also known as the Battle of Burr Oak Grove, on June 16, 1832, Illinois militia forces fought against a band of at least 80 Native Americans. During the battle, three militia men under the command of Adam W. Snyder were killed in action. The second battle occurred nine days later when a larger Sauk and Meskwaki band, under the command of Black Hawk, attacked Major John Dement's detachment and killed five militia men.

The second battle is known for playing a role in Abraham Lincoln's short career in the Illinois militia. He was part of a relief company sent to the grove on June 26 and he helped bury the dead. He made a statement about the incident years later which was recollected in Carl Sandburg's writing, among others. Sources conflict about who actually won the battle; it has been called a "rout" for both sides. The battle was the last on Illinois soil during the Black Hawk War.

== Background ==
As a consequence of an 1804 treaty between the Governor of Indiana Territory and a group of Sauk and Meskwaki leaders regarding land settlement, the Sauk and Meskwaki tribes vacated their lands in Illinois and moved west of the Mississippi in 1828. However, Sauk leader Black Hawk and others disputed the treaty, claiming that the full tribal councils had not been consulted, nor did those representing the tribes have authorization to cede lands. Angered by the loss of his birthplace, from 1830 Black Hawk led a number of incursions across the Mississippi River, but was persuaded to return west each time without bloodshed. In April 1832, encouraged by promises of alliance with other tribes and the British, he again moved his so-called "British Band" of around 1000 warriors and non-combatants into Illinois. Finding no allies he attempted to return to Iowa, but events overtook him and led to the Battle of Stillman's Run. A number of other engagements and massacres followed, and the militias of Michigan Territory and Illinois were mobilized to hunt down Black Hawk's band.

== Prelude ==
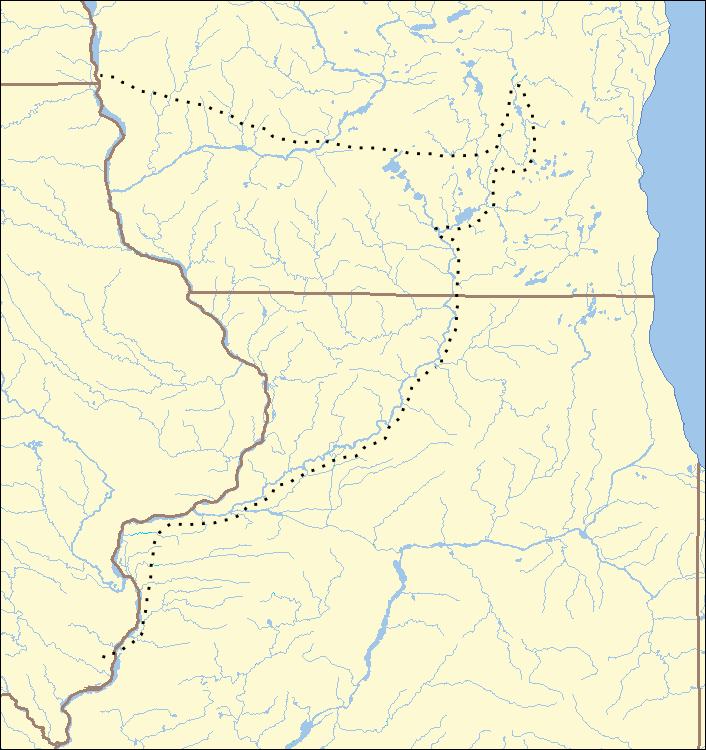
Map of Black Hawk War sites
Battle (with name) Fort / settlement Native village
Symbols are wikilinked to article

In the days preceding the second Battle of Kellogg's Grove a raid occurred on Bureau Creek, between the Rock and Illinois Rivers. Major John Dement's battalion was ordered to the scene to protect settlers and ascertain the presence of Native Americans in the area, they were to report to Colonel Zachary Taylor at Dixon's Ferry. On June 22 Dement reached Dixon's Ferry where he reported to Taylor. Taylor then ordered him to cross the Rock River to take a position between Dixon's Ferry and Galena. Additionally, Taylor ordered Dement to set up his headquarters at Kellogg's Grove. With a command of 140 inexperienced men, Dement set out for the grove to replace a group of volunteers led by a Major Riley who had abandoned the fort on June 23. The troops that abandoned the fort had skirmished with the Native Americans two or three times and were defeated in all clashes, according to the soldiers stationed there. Major Dement's group crossed the Rock River on June 24 and reached the small fort at Kellogg's Grove where they camped for the night.

The day before the second Battle of Kellogg's Grove, June 24, Black Hawk was leading his band in an attack on Apple River Fort. During the Battle of Apple River Fort the Sauk besieged the small stockade for much of the day. Other warriors were dispatched to gather food, horses and other supplies, all of which were badly needed by the band. The following day the group would reach Kellogg's Grove where they would engage Dement's militia forces.

== Battles ==
=== First Battle of Kellogg's Grove ===
The first Battle of Kellogg's Grove, or the Battle of Burr Oak Grove, occurred on June 16, 1832. Men from Captain Adam Wilson Snyder's company engaged part of a group of about 80 Kickapoo warriors resulting in three militia deaths and six Kickapoo deaths.

On the night of June 15, 1832, Captain Snyder and his men were in Kellogg's Grove when Native Americans were discovered in the area, during the night a horse was stolen. The next day, June 16, Snyder and his men pursued the Native Americans to the southwest; they came upon four natives and killed them. During the ensuing skirmish, Private William B. Mecomson was fatally wounded. The militia men put the wounded man on a litter and began to carry him back to the Kellogg cabin, along the way Mecomson asked that the group stop to rest. The group stopped and some of the men went for water while the rest waited with Mecomson. As they waited, a large group of Native Americans came upon them; a short battle followed and two more militia members were killed. After the short skirmish, the natives left the area and the militia men returned to the Kellogg cabin and buried their dead the next day.

=== Second Battle of Kellogg's Grove ===
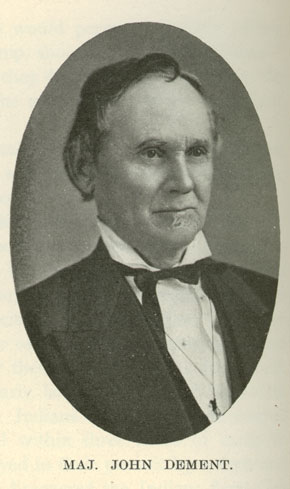
Major John Dement commanded forces during the battle and suffered five killed in action.

The Second Battle of Kellogg's Grove occurred on June 25, 1832, after Major John Dement and his men, while camped at Kellogg's Grove on Sunday June 24, learned of a large group of Native Americans nearby. The battle pitted a large band of Native American warriors led by Black Hawk and his warchiefs Neapope and Weesheet against Dement's spy company of militia men. Dement's company had been searching the area for bands of warriors sent out by Black Hawk and their trail had led to Kellogg's Grove.

During the night, three of the militia's horses wandered off; the next day, June 25, three men went in search of the animals while the rest stayed behind. At the cabin, seven Native American braves appeared in the distance. The troops immediately began pursuing the natives, who fled into the woods, instead of reporting the sighting to Dement. The Native American warriors, as had been done other times during the course of the war, set an ambush for the militia men in the forest. The militia pursued the natives into the woods and, as they entered the forest, the natives opened fire, the volley instantly killed two militia men and wounded another. The militia retreated and formed a battle line but the native forces would not relent. The rest of Dement's company attempted to rescue the outmatched militia men but were unable to beat back the native warriors. Black Hawk's band attacked the militia men, again forcing the beleaguered force to fall back to the Kellogg cabin and barn.

As the militia fell back, the three men who had set out in search of their horses returned and they too were killed by the Native American forces. The natives continued to assault the barn and cabin; their attacks did not cease and during the battle about 25 horses were killed. Finally, the native forces withdrew, leaving nine of their own dead behind. The June 25 battle was the last of the Black Hawk War on Illinois soil. Dement's company lost five men with another three were wounded, many horses were killed as well.

That night American reinforcements arrived under the command of General Alexander Posey, who chose not to pursue the attackers and instead reported the situation to Colonel Zachary Taylor. Black Hawk asserted later that had Posey chose to attack him and his warriors that the blow dealt Black Hawk's band would have been decisive and war-ending. In fact, Dement's opinion was that there were more Native Americans at Kellogg's Grove than at any other engagement during the war. The next day more reinforcements arrived when Captain Jacob Early's detachment reached the grove.

== Lincoln's role ==
Abraham Lincoln's service during the Black Hawk War has been a source of discrepancies and questioning, with two major battle sites being affiliated with Lincoln in the aftermath of combat. A number of sources assert that on June 26, 1832, the morning after the second battle, members of the company of Captain Jacob M. Early arrived at Kellogg's Grove to help bury the dead. One of the soldiers in the company was Abraham Lincoln. Lincoln assisted with the burial and later made a statement about the experience that has been connected with both the battle at Kellogg's Grove and the fight at Stillman's Run.

I remember just how those men looked as we rode up the little hill where their camp was. The red light of the morning sun was streaming upon them as they lay head towards us on the ground. And every man had a round red spot on top of his head, about as big as a dollar where the redskins had taken his scalp. It was frightful, but it was grotesque, and the red sunlight seemed to paint everything all over. I remember one man had on buckskin breeches.

The Lincoln quote appeared both in William H. Herndon and Jesse W. Wiek's Life of Lincoln and Carl Sandburg's Lincoln biography, Abraham Lincoln The Prairie Years. Lincoln's presence at Stillman's Run was still under investigation as of 2003, but his presence at Kellogg's Grove has been corroborated by several sources.

Lincoln made a humorous remark during an 1848 speech before the U.S. Congress in which he referenced his Black Hawk War service, mentioning Stillman's Run by name.

By the way Mr. Speaker, did you know that I am a military hero? Yes sir, in the days of the Black Hawk War I fought, bled and came away . . . I was not at Stillman's defeat, but I was about as near it as Cass was Hull's surrender, and, like him, I saw the place very soon afterwards.

The marble facade at the monument, erected in 1901, commemorating the battle in Stillman Valley, Illinois includes the reference to Lincoln's, "The presence of soldier, statesman, martyr, Abraham Lincoln assisting in the burial of these honored dead has made this spot more sacred."

== Aftermath ==
Sources vary concerning exactly which side was victorious during the battle. The Battle of Kellogg's Grove, like many of the battles and skirmishes during the Black Hawk War, had no real order or strategy. Early sources indicated that the battle was a complete victory for the state militia, declaring the battle a rout and noting that the Sauk lost 15 while the militia only suffered 5 men killed. Conversely, according to the Illinois Department of Natural Resources, the result, essentially, was that the band of approximately 50 Sauk warriors routed the 300 or so ill-disciplined white troops.

The battle site at Kellogg's Grove was listed on the U.S. National Register of Historic Places on June 23, 1978. The listing included a 1 1/2 acre public park where a stone monument and memorial cemetery is located. The cemetery holds the interred remains of the militia who died during both battles at Kellogg's Grove. The men were initially buried in other spots around the grove but during the 1880s local farmers banded together to collect the remains of the Black Hawk War dead and inter them in one spot beneath a memorial.

== See also ==
- List of battles fought in Illinois
