= George Bird (baseball) =

American baseball player (1850–1940)

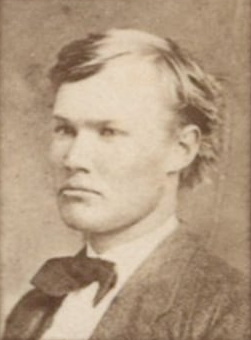
- Outfielder
- Born: June 23, 1850; Stillman Valley, Illinois, U.S.
- Died: November 9, 1940 (aged 90); Rockford, Illinois, U.S.
- Batted: Right Threw: Right

Major league debut
- May 6, 1871, for the Rockford Forest Citys

Last major league appearance
- September 15, 1871, for the Rockford Forest Citys

Major league statistics
- Batting average: .264
- Home runs: 0
- RBI: 13
- Stats at Baseball Reference

Teams
- Rockford Forest Citys (1871)

George Raymond Bird (June 23, 1850 – November 9, 1940) was an American professional baseball center fielder in the 19th century. He played for the Rockford Forest Citys of the National Association in 1871. He was a native of Stillman Valley, Illinois.

In 25 games as the Forest Citys starting center fielder, Bird batted .264 (28-for-106) with two doubles, five triples, 13 RBIs, and 19 runs scored.

At the time of his death he was the last living player from the 1871 season.
