= Harlem Township =

Harlem Township may refer to:

- Harlem Township, Stephenson County, Illinois
- Harlem Township, Winnebago County, Illinois
- Harlem Township, Sargent County, North Dakota, in Sargent County, North Dakota
- Harlem Township, Delaware County, Ohio
