= Stillman Creek (Illinois) =

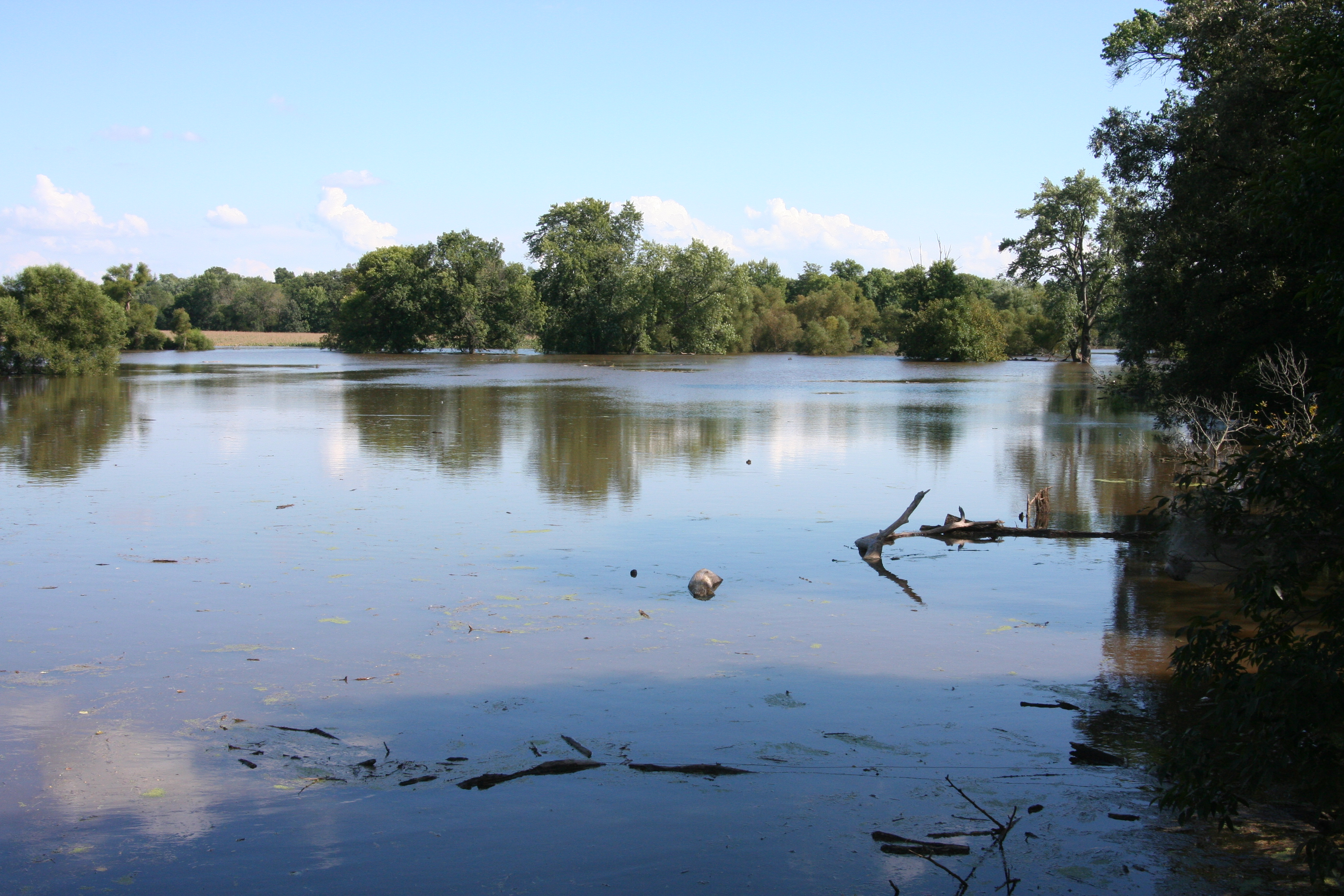
- Stillman Creek during the 2007 Midwest flooding

- Location of the Mouth of Stillman Creek in Ogle County, Illinois
- Etymology: Isaiah Stillman, Battle of Stillman's Run

Location
- Country: United States
- State: Illinois
- County: Ogle

Physical characteristics
- Source: near the unincorporated community of Kings
  - location: White Rock Township, Ogle County, Illinois
  - coordinates: 42°01′40″N 89°06′20″W
  - elevation: 679 ft (207 m)
- Mouth: Rock River
  - location: Stillman Valley, in Marion Township, Ogle County, Illinois
  - coordinates: 42°07′34″N 89°13′51″W

Stillman Creek, also known during different eras as Mud Creek, Old Man's Creek, Sycamore Creek, and Stillman's Run, is part of the Rock River watershed, and located in Ogle County, Illinois, United States. The stream was named for Isaiah Stillman, who also lent his name to the village of Stillman Valley, Illinois, which lies along the creek.

== Course ==
Stillman Creek originates near Kings, Illinois and continues its course through Ogle County until it reaches the Rock River at its mouth. The creek is 18.0 miles (29.0 km) long.

== Natural history ==
Before the Rock River country was settled, which includes the area surrounding Stillman Creek, 35% of the land was covered with prairie; as of 2000 there were 48 acres (190,000 m^{2}) of pre-settlement prairie remaining within the Rock River basin. The land surrounding the Rock River and its tributaries is home to a wide variety of plant and animal species. Found throughout the Rock River country 122 species of native birds, 33 species of reptiles, 78 species of mammals, 33 species of native mussel and 10 species of native crustaceans. Of the 950 plant taxa found in the river country, 27 are ferns species. In total, 56 species of Illinois endangered or threatened species make their habitat within Rock River country.

== History ==
The creek was the site of the 1832 Battle of Stillman's Run during the Black Hawk War. The battle and the creek became humorously known as "Stillman's Run" after Stillman and his men fled the battlefield in defeat, believing they were being chased by thousands of Chief Black Hawk's warriors. The use of the word "run" was a double entendre describing both the creek and Stillman's "tactics" during the battle. It has been known by other names as well, those include, Mud Creek, Old Man's Creek, and Sycamore Creek. The stream's current name, Stillman Creek, descended from Isaiah Stillman, who also lent his name to the village of Stillman Valley (via the creek), along the creek, in Ogle County. A 1999 water quality assessment by the Illinois Environmental Protection Agency rated Stillman's Creek as "good," along with about 78% of the rest of the water ways found in the Rock River watershed. In modern times, the village of Stillman Valley has been authorized to discharge treated wastewater into the creek. During the 2007 Midwest flooding the creek poured over its banks.

== Geography ==
Stillman Creek's elevation is 679 feet (207.0 m) above sea level and it is part of the Rock River watershed.
