= Fort Dixon =

Former fort in Dixon, Illinois, US

Coordinates: 41.84613°N 89.485115°W

A Painting of Fort Dixon

Fort Dixon, located along the banks of the Rock River in present day Dixon, Illinois, served as a military base during the Black Hawk War.

== History ==
While currently known as Dixon, Illinois, the town was named Dixon's Ferry at the time of the construction of the fort.

On May 22, 1832, Fort Dixon was officially named as a base by General Henry Atkinson. Because the site was centrally located between Fort Dearborn, Fort Armstrong, and Fort Clark, General Atkinson established Fort Dixon as his command post. Additionally, the Illinois militia used the ferry to transport troops and supplies across the river.

Many notable soldiers served at Fort Dixon, including Abraham Lincoln, Jefferson Davis, Winfield Scott, and Zachary Taylor.

== Replica ==
According to a Fort Dixon website , citizens interested in rebuilding a Fort Dixon replica are encouraged to contact the group for further information .

== See also ==
- Fort Dearborn
- Fort Armstrong
- Fort Clark
