= Marion Township, Ogle County, Illinois =

Marion Township
- Township
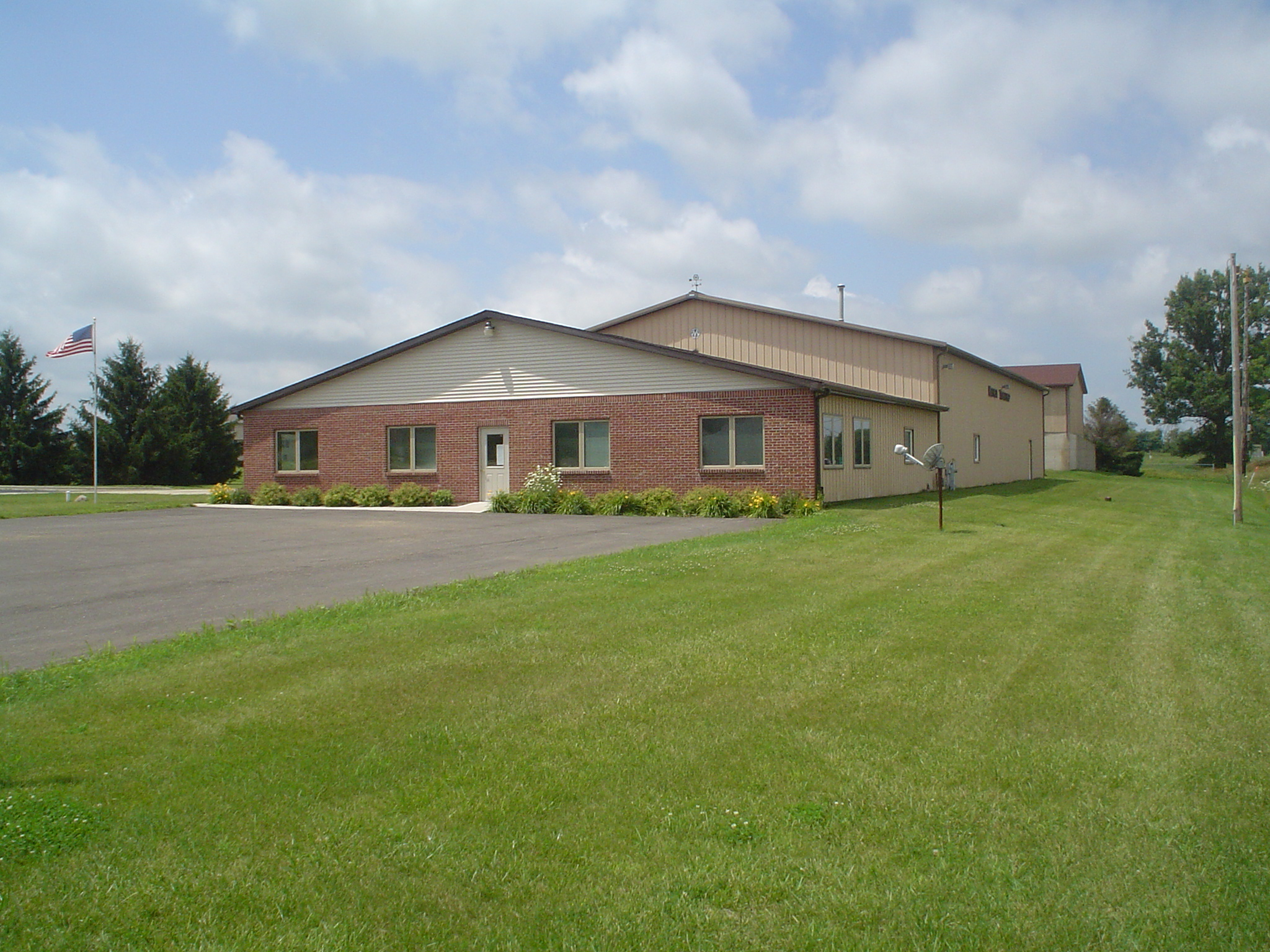
- Marion Township building.

- Location of Illinois in the United States
- Coordinates: 42°05′24″N 89°13′04″W
- Country: United States
- State: Illinois
- County: Ogle
- Organized: November 6, 1849

Government
  - Mayor: Thomas Webber

Area
  - Total: 45.42 sq mi (117.6 km^{2})
  - Land: 44.84 sq mi (116.1 km^{2})
  - Water: 0.57 sq mi (1.5 km^{2})
- Elevation: 738 ft (225 m)

Population (2010)
  - Estimate (2016): 3,966
  - Density: 92.2/sq mi (35.6/km^{2})
- Time zone: UTC-6 (CST)
  - Summer (DST): UTC-5 (CDT)
- FIPS code: 17-141-46903

Marion Township is located in Ogle County, Illinois. As of the 2010 census, its population was 4,135 and it contained 1,531 housing units. This population dropped in 2022 when a population of 3,898 people was recorded.

== Geography ==
According to the 2010 census, the township has a total area of 45.42 square miles (117.6 km^{2}), of which 44.84 square miles (116.1 km^{2}) (or 98.72%) is land and 0.57 square miles (1.5 km^{2}) (or 1.25%) is water.

== Demographics ==
Historical population
Census	Pop.	Note	%±
2016 (est.)	3,966
U.S. Decennial Census
