= John A. Atwood =

American businessman and politician (1850–1930)

John A. Atwood (May 21, 1850–August 31, 1930) was an American businessman and politician.

Atwood was born in the Province of Canada. He lived in Stillman Valley, Illinois and went to the public schools. He was involved in the insurance business. Atwood also worked as an embalmer in the funeral home business. He served as a township assessor and as a justice of the peace. Atwood served on the board of trustees for the State Training School for Girls in Geneva, Illinois. He was a Republican. Atwood served in the Illinois House of Representatives from 1911 to 1917 and in the Illinois Senate from 1917 to 1921. Atwood was the editor and publisher of the Stillman Valley Graphic newspaper. Henry Andrus, who also served in the Illinois General Assembly, was Atwood's brother in law; Andrus's wife was Atwood's sister. He died in Rockford, Illinois.
