= Harlem Township, Winnebago County, Illinois =

Harlem Township
- Township
- Location in Winnebago County
- Coordinates: 42°21′56″N 88°59′47″W
- Country: United States
- State: Illinois
- County: Winnebago
- Established: November 6, 1849

Government
  - Supervisor: Aaron McKnight

Area
  - Total: 33.359 sq mi (86.40 km^{2})
  - Land: 32.674 sq mi (84.63 km^{2})
  - Water: 0.685 sq mi (1.77 km^{2}) 2.05%
- Elevation: 817 ft (249 m)

Population (2020)
  - Total: 39,247
  - Density: 1,201.2/sq mi (463.77/km^{2})
- Time zone: UTC-6 (CST)
  - Summer (DST): UTC-5 (CDT)
- FIPS code: 17-201-32928
- Website: www.harlemtownshipwinnebago.com

Harlem Township is a civil township in Winnebago County, Illinois, United States. As of the 2020 census, it had 39,247 residents and 16,565 housing units.

== History ==
The first settlement in the area was on the east side of the Rock River, at a place then called Big Bottom. Hiram Wattles platted a proposed town called Scipio there in 1835, but only one house was built and the settlement did not develop.

Winnebago County adopted township government on November 6, 1849, and Harlem Township was established that day. Harlem village moved east in 1859 to be near the new Kenosha and Rockford Railroad. The North Park area incorporated as the village of Machesney Park in 1981; the Census Bureau subsequently deleted the North Park census-designated place because it had been included within the new village.

== Geography ==
Harlem Township has a total area of 33.359 square miles (86.40 km^{2}), of which 32.674 square miles (84.63 km^{2}) is land and 0.685 square miles (1.77 km^{2}) (2.05%) is water.

== Demographics ==
Historical population
Census	Pop.	Note	%±
2010	40,158		—
2020	39,247		−2.3%
U.S. Decennial Census

The township's population declined by 2.3% from 40,158 in 2010 to 39,247 in 2020. In 2020, the population was 82.5% White, 3.8% Black or African American, 2.6% Asian, 0.3% American Indian and Alaska Native, less than 0.1% Native Hawaiian and Other Pacific Islander, 2.5% some other race, and 8.4% two or more races. Hispanic or Latino residents of any race numbered 3,113, or 7.9% of the population.
