= Stillman Valley, Illinois =

Stillman Valley
- Village
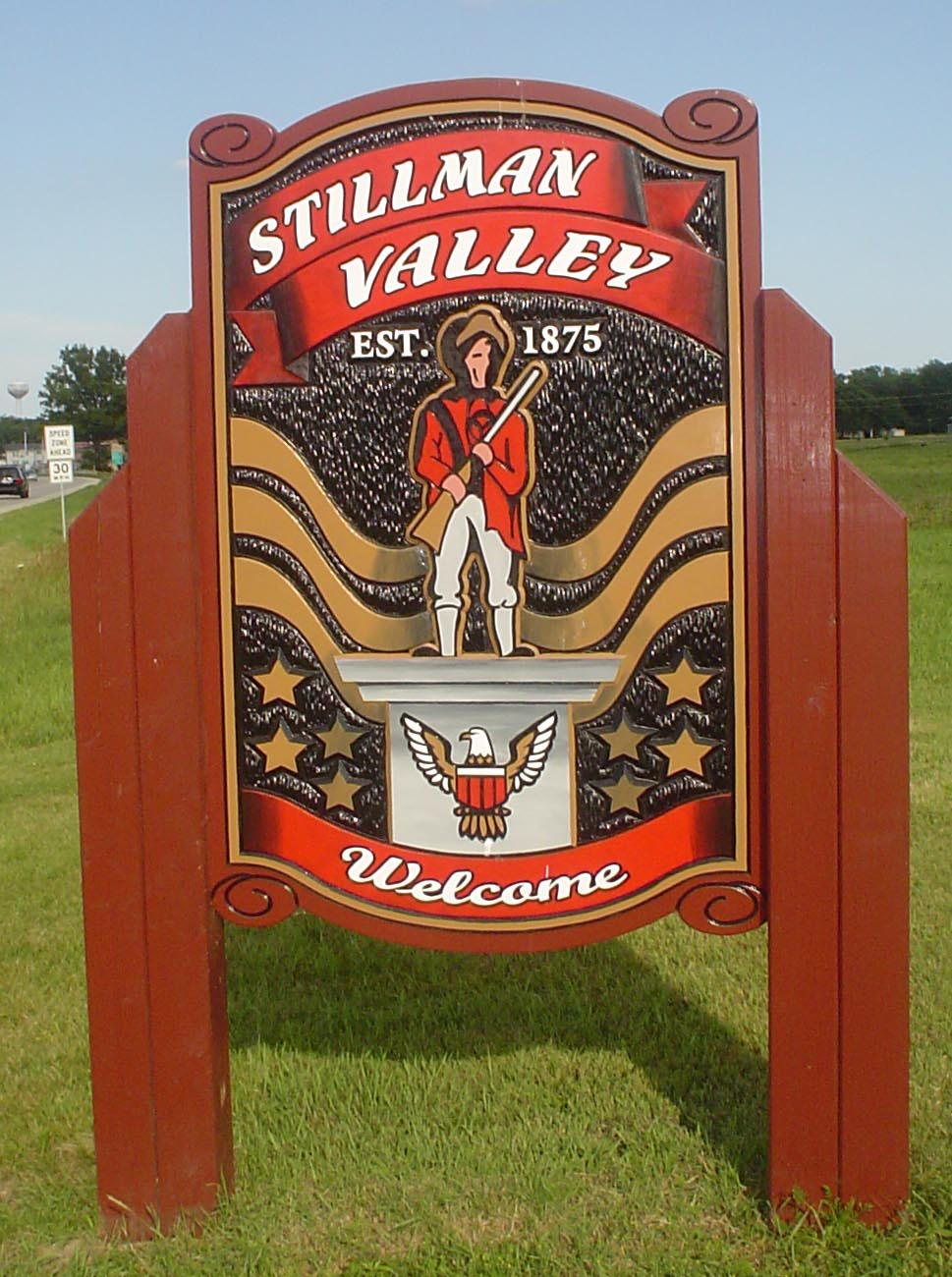
- Sign leading into Stillman Valley

- Location of Stillman Valley in Ogle County, Illinois.

- Location within Ogle County Stillman Valley (Illinois)
- Coordinates: 42°06′20″N 89°10′44″W
- Country: United States
- State: Illinois
- County: Ogle
- Township: Marion
- Established: 1875

Area
  - Total: 0.57 sq mi (1.48 km^{2})
  - Land: 0.57 sq mi (1.48 km^{2})
  - Water: 0 sq mi (0.00 km^{2})
- Elevation: 719 ft (219 m)

Population (2020)
  - Total: 1,075
  - Density: 1,885.4/sq mi (727.94/km^{2})
- Time zone: UTC-6 (CST)
  - Summer (DST): UTC-5 (CDT)
- Zip code: 61084
- Area code: 815
- FIPS code: 17-72702
- GNIS feature ID: 2399901
- Website: www.stillmanvalley.us

Stillman Valley is a village in Marion Township, Ogle County, Illinois, United States. It lies east of Byron, south of Rockford and west of Davis Junction. As of the 2020 census, Stillman Valley had a population of 1,075. The village is located on the Iowa, Chicago and Eastern Railroad, on the old Chicago Great Western Railway before it merged and was pulled up. Also, Illinois Route 72 runs through the village. It is near the site of the first battle of the Black Hawk War of 1832. The war memorial for the Battle of Stillman's Run is located in this village.

== History ==
Stillman Valley was founded by European-American settlers in north central Illinois in 1876. A creek running through the community was named after Major Stillman of the Illinois Militia who on May 14, 1832, led troops in what became the first named battle of the Black Hawk War. The battle and the creek were called "Stillman's Run" after Stillman and his men fled the battlefield in the belief that they had been attacked by a superior force of Chief Black Hawk's warriors. The day after the battle, Abraham Lincoln was with the militia who buried the dead soldiers from the battle. The village was named after Stillman Creek; the valley serves as the watershed for the creek, hence the name Stillman Valley.

The Stillman's Run Battle Site and burial ground are in present-day Stillman Valley. A large memorial to this battle was erected in 1901. It reads, in part: "Here, on May 14, 1832, the first engagement of the Black Hawk War took place. When 275 Illinois militiamen under Maj. Isaiah Stillman were put to flight by Black Hawk and his warriors."

== Geography ==
According to the 2010 census, Stillman Valley has a total area of 0.54 square miles (1.40 km^{2}), all land.

== Demographics ==
Historical population
Census	Pop.	Note	%±
1880	92		—
1920	313		—
1930	348		11.2%
1940	333		−4.3%
1950	362		8.7%
1960	598		65.2%
1970	871		45.7%
1980	961		10.3%
1990	848		−11.8%
2000	1,048		23.6%
2010	1,120		6.9%
2020	1,075		−4.0%
U.S. Decennial Census

They are state champions in high school football 1999, 2000, 2003, 2009, and 2013.

=== 2020 census ===
As of the 2020 census, Stillman Valley had a population of 1,075. The median age was 39.1 years. 22.8% of residents were under the age of 18 and 18.5% of residents were 65 years of age or older. For every 100 females there were 93.7 males, and for every 100 females age 18 and over there were 90.8 males age 18 and over.

0.0% of residents lived in urban areas, while 100.0% lived in rural areas.

There were 432 households in Stillman Valley, of which 31.7% had children under the age of 18 living in them. Of all households, 51.6% were married-couple households, 13.9% were households with a male householder and no spouse or partner present, and 25.7% were households with a female householder and no spouse or partner present. About 25.0% of all households were made up of individuals and 13.0% had someone living alone who was 65 years of age or older.

There were 452 housing units, of which 4.4% were vacant. The homeowner vacancy rate was 0.9% and the rental vacancy rate was 0.0%.

Racial composition as of the 2020 census
Race	Number	Percent
White	956	88.9%
Black or African American	8	0.7%
American Indian and Alaska Native	0	0.0%
Asian	4	0.4%
Native Hawaiian and Other Pacific Islander	0	0.0%
Some other race	17	1.6%
Two or more races	90	8.4%
Hispanic or Latino (of any race)	48	4.5%

=== 2000 census ===
As of the 2000 census, there were 1,048 people, 395 households, and 295 families residing in the village. The population density was 735.7 /sq mi (284.1 /km^{2}). There were 417 housing units at an average density of 292.7 per square mile (113.0/km^{2}). The racial makeup of the village was 97.23% White, 0.29% African American, 0.67% Native American, 0.38% Asian, 0.48% from other races, and 0.95% from two or more races. Hispanic or Latino of any race were 1.43% of the population.

There were 395 households, out of which 39.2% had children under the age of 18 living with them, 61.5% were married couples living together, 10.9% had a female householder with no husband present, and 25.3% were non-families. 23.3% of all households were made up of individuals, and 10.1% had someone living alone who was 65 years of age or older. The average household size was 2.65 and the average family size was 3.14.

In the village, the population was spread out, with 30.5% under the age of 18, 6.5% from 18 to 24, 31.3% from 25 to 44, 20.1% from 45 to 64, and 11.5% who were 65 years of age or older. The median age was 35 years. For every 100 females, there were 90.2 males. For every 100 females age 18 and over, there were 90.6 males.

The median income for a household in the village was $46,845, and the median income for a family was $54,792. Males had a median income of $36,635 versus $28,250 for females. The per capita income for the village was $21,036. About 4.6% of families and 4.6% of the population were below the poverty line, including 4.5% of those under age 18 and 5.7% of those age 65 or over.

== Political representation ==
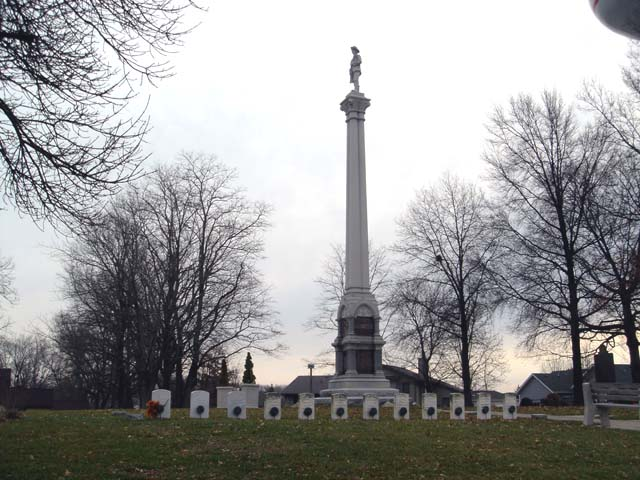
Monument located in Stillman Valley

Stillman Valley has a board of trustees who serve alternating four-year terms. The Village President (by statute this is synonymous with the term "Mayor") serves a four-year term as well.

- 16th Congressional District represented by Darin LaHood.
- Illinois Senate District 45 represented by Tim Bivins.
- Illinois Representative District 90 represented by Tom Demmer.
- Village President is Martin Typper

=== Previous village presidents ===
- Jim Mays served from 2005 - 2013 (2 terms)
- James Leather served from 1984 - 2004 (20 years service)
- Stillman Valley elected Mike Blomgren, an 18-year-old high school senior, as its mayor in 1976.

== Education ==
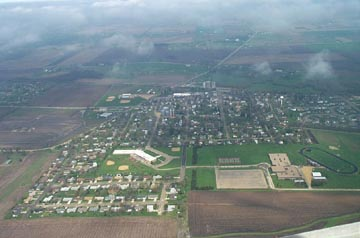
View over Stillman Valley

Stillman Valley is in the Meridian Unified School District (District #223). The school district has four schools and covers approximately 125 square miles (320 km^{2}). The schools are Highland Grade School, Monroe Center School, Meridian Junior High School and Stillman Valley High School. The high school is well known in Illinois for excellent academic and sports programs. A November 28, 2009, headline from the Rockford Register Star proclaims it, "Valley of The Champions" in reference to the boys football program with state championships in 1999, 2000, 2003, 2009, and 2013.

== Notable people ==
- John A. Atwood, businessman and Illinois state legislator
- George Bird, center fielder with the Rockford Forest Citys
- Dawn Gile, a member of the Maryland Senate for District 33
- Dan Godfread, center with the Minnesota Timberwolves and Houston Rockets
- Frank White, the eighth governor of North Dakota
- Joshua White, businessman and Illinois state legislator
