= Samuel Whiteside =

American politician and soldier (1783–1866)

Samuel A. Whiteside
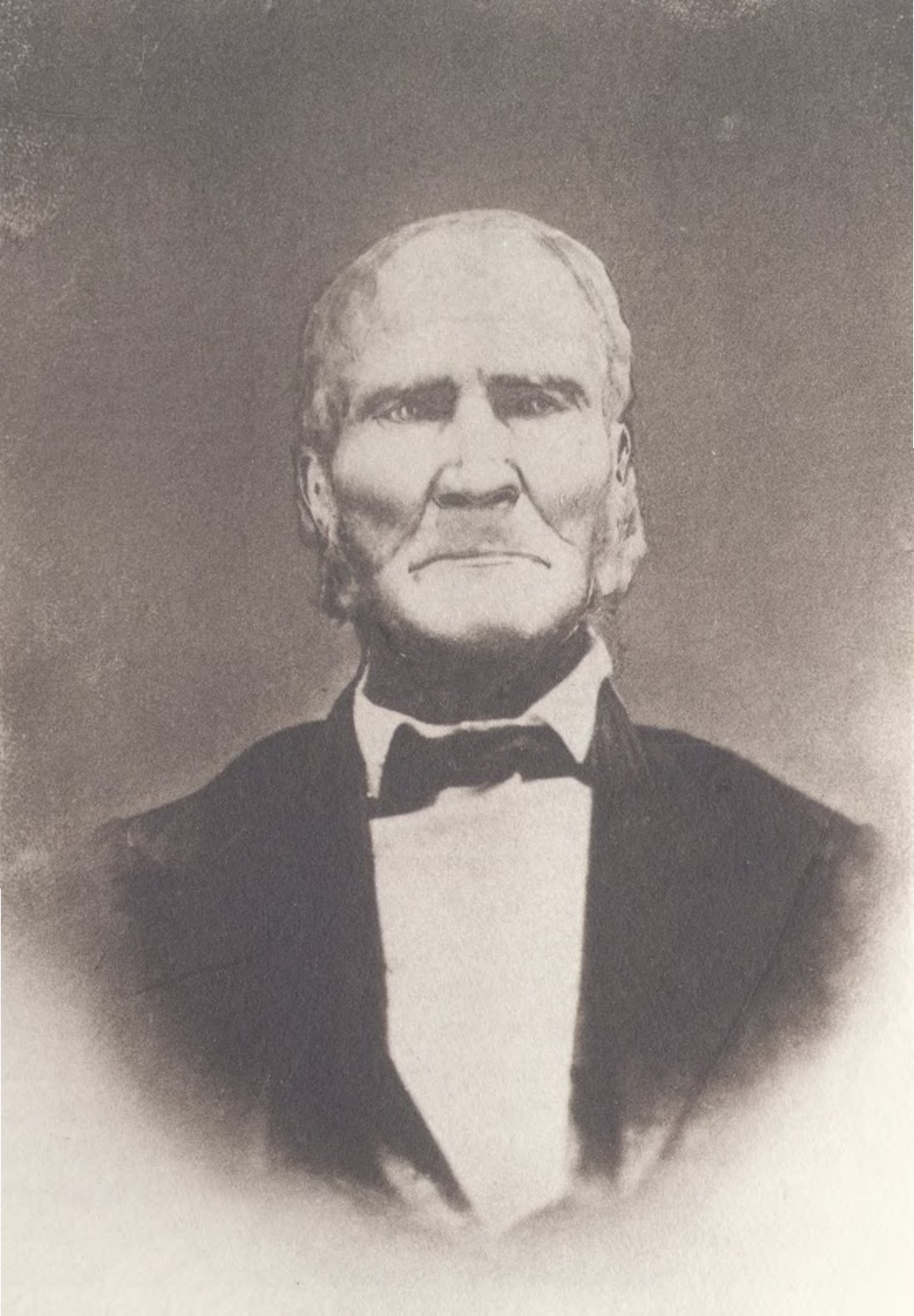
- In office 1819–1821

Personal details
- Born: April 12, 1783 Rutherford County, North Carolina, US
- Died: January 12, 1866 (aged 82) Christian County, Illinois, US
- Spouse: Nancy Miller
- Profession: Farmer, soldier, politician

Military service
- Allegiance: United States
- Branch/service: U.S. Army, Ranger
- Years of service: 1810-1814; 1831–1832
- Rank: captain (1812-1814) general (1811-1812), (1831-1832) corporal(1832–1833)
- Unit: Illinois militia
- Commands: Blackhawk War

Samuel Whiteside (April 12, 1783 – January 12, 1866) was an Illinois pioneer. A farmer and backwoodsman, Whiteside briefly served in the Illinois General Assembly after statehood and led the Illinois militia for decades, rising to the rank of general but also enlisting as an ordinary soldier when militia calls declined at the end of wars. Whiteside fought the British in the War of 1812 and Native Americans through the Blackhawk War (including in the Illinois Territory before statehood and later in the Wisconsin Territory).

== Early and family life ==
Samuel Whiteside was born on April 12, 1783, in Rutherford County, North Carolina to the former Judith Tolley and her husband John D. Whiteside. His paternal grandfather, William Whiteside Sr., was a patriot who signed the Tryon Resolves during the American Revolutionary War, and whose sons Davis, James, John D., William B., Thomas, Samuel, and Adam Whiteside all fought the British at the Battle of Kings Mountain in 1780. William Whiteside arrived to the American Colonies from Ireland, though he was of an Anglo-Irish background. Davis Whiteside died of wounds suffered in that battle, previously having also signed the Tryon Resolves.

Around 1792, Whiteside and his remaining sons moved west toward St. Louis, Missouri, to take advantage of land claims allotted to veterans. Before crossing the Mississippi River, they settled near Columbia, Monroe County, Illinois on the abandoned Flannery Fort site protecting the important early Kaskaskia to Cahokia Trail. Flannery had been killed and scalped during an attack by Native Americans in 1783 and the site had been abandoned for a decade. The elder William F. Whiteside was a militia captain and lived at the fort, which was called Whiteside Station until he died in 1815 (shortly before Illinois became a state). He had survived his son Thomas (who died at the fort in 1795, possibly during the Indian raid that Samuel survived and which shaped his later military career).

His son John (Samuel's father) moved his family to Bellefountaine (now Waterloo, Illinois), also on the Kaskaskia/Cahokia trail in Monroe County, Illinois; his nephew another John D. Whiteside (1799–1850) would later represent Monroe County in the Illinois legislature. Around 1800 many Whiteside descendants moved to the Goshen Settlement, in Madison County, Illinois, about 12 miles northeast of St. Louis and near modern Edwardsville, Illinois. One of them was William Bolin Whiteside (1777–1833), who owned at least two slaves, became a militia captain for that area for decades and was elected the first sheriff of Madison County after statehood (and served until a scandal in 1822). Meanwhile, this Samuel Whiteside and his brother Joel purchased land in what became Maryville, Illinois (in Madison County about 17 miles from St. Louis) in 1802. Some Whiteside relatives would cross the Mississippi River and Whiteside, Missouri would be named after early landowner William Whiteside. Other Whitesides (including this Samuel's children) moved inland to Niantic, Macon County, Illinois. Meanwhile, Samuel Whiteside in 1804 married Virginia-born Nancy Miller (1789–1851). Their children included: Michael Whiteside (1805–1881), Judith Whiteside Waddell (1806–1876), Nancy Whiteside (b. 1808), Sarah Whiteside (b. 1810), Joel Whiteside (1811–1882), William Modrel Whiteside (1812–1864), Thomas Whiteside (b. 1815), Samuel Ray Whiteside (1820–1866), Elizabeth Ann (Eliza) Whiteside Henderson (1812–1910), John Perry Whiteside (1822–) and Mary Ann Whiteside (b. 1830). The family did not own slaves in the 1820 Federal census, nor the 1830 Federal census. In the 1850 census, Samuel Whiteside farmed in Madison County near his younger sons Samuel Ray and John Perry Whiteside and their families; the census found no slaves in the county.

== Indian fighter, legislator and farmer ==
In 1811, during Tecumseh's War, Whiteside received command of a company, in the newly formed 17th Illinois Infantry. The following year, during the War of 1812, Captain Samuel Whiteside commanded a company of mounted infantry in the Illinois militia from August to November 1812. This company was drawn from St. Clair County, which adjoined Columbia, Illinois to the north and comprised most of the modern State. Whiteside had enlisted as an ensign (January 2, 1810) in the Illinois militia and received promotions to captain (August 22, 1812), major (February 26, 1817), colonel (May 22, 1817) and brigadier general (1819). Once during the War of 1812, captain Whiteside saved boats of fellow soldiers who tried to cross the Mississippi to attack St. Louis, but were endangered during a retreat by shifting winds as well as the great river's current.

In August 1813 Whiteside received a captain's commission in the Regular Army and led a Ranger unit. In 1814, a woman and six children near Alton, Illinois were killed by Native Americans. Captain Whiteside and his men pursued the killers, and killed one of them found hiding in a tree. Whiteside was discharged from the Army on July 30, 1814, but was among the witnesses to treaties with the Kickapoo and Osage in 1815.

Following Illinois' statehood in 1818, Whiteside served on the commission to select a new site for the Illinois State Capital, selecting Vandalia, Illinois at the confluence of the Kaskaskia and Mississippi Rivers and the end of the National Road; it would remain the state capital until Abraham Lincoln and other legislators secured a move inland to Springfield in 1839. Meanwhile, voters elected Whiteside as a delegate in the first Illinois General Assembly; he served from 1819 to 1821 and did not seek re-election. Instead, he returned to farming and leading the Madison County militia.

In 1827, after drunk boatman abducted and raped several Ho-Chunk (Winnebago) women near what became Prairie Du Chien, Wisconsin (then Wisconsin Territory) and their menfolk rescued them in a skirmish in which both Native Americans and whites died, Whiteside and his militiamen, along with Generals Lewis Cass and Henry Atkinson and Col. Henry Dodge pursued the Winnebago warriors. Chief Red Bird surrendered at Portage on the condition that his people would suffer no reprisals, but died in prison a year later.

From April 26 to June 30, 1832, during the Black Hawk War, Governor John Reynolds commissioned Whiteside as a brigadier general in the Illinois militia. Whiteside in turn commissioned 23-year-old Abraham Lincoln as a militia captain (and Lincoln would serve a month until this phase of the war ended); future governor Thomas Ford also served under Whiteside. In late April, U.S. Army General Henry Atkinson at Rock Island sent Reynolds, Whiteside and their militia up the Rock River and the Sauk Trail, planning to join forces at Prophetstown, Illinois, home of Wabokieshiek (White Cloud), one of Black Hawk's chief advisors and who had created the settlement after Black Hawk had been barred from his native village Saukenuk at the confluence of the Mississippi and Rock Rivers. On May 10, 1832, Whiteside gave the order to burn the abandoned Prophetstown, and proceeded upriver to secure Dixon's ferry, a relatively new settlement and post office where the Peoria/Galena wagon road crossed the Rock River. Although Whiteside initially remained at Dixon waiting for the regular army, at Governor Reynolds' urging, he sent a scout company under Major Isaiah Stillman to seek out Black Hawk's British Band. Stillman's men imprisoned some of Black Hawk's emissaries, but fled after the British Band attacked; General Whiteside led the small group which buried the 11 dead militiamen after what became known as the Battle of Stillman's Run. When the militia troops were discharged as the war's Rock River valley phase ended in June 1832, Whiteside volunteered to continue as a private and fought until the war's end.

Whiteside again returned to farming in Madison County, Illinois. In 1854, three years after burying his wife, he sold the farm and moved inland to Christian County, Illinois, where several of his children had moved. He lived with son-in-law William Henderson, his daughter, Elizabeth and their children and hired help.

== Death and legacy ==
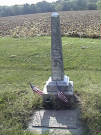
Gravesite of General Samuel Whiteside in Hunter Cemetery Christian County, Mosquito Township Illinois.

Brigadier General Samuel Whiteside died at his daughter's home in Mt. Auburn in Christian County on January 3, 1866. He is buried at Hunter Cemetery, in Christian County.

During his lifetime, Illinois legislators created several counties along the Rock River from lands cleared for settlement during the Blackhawk War. They named the county which included Prophetstown Whiteside County, Illinois to honor this Samuel Whiteside. His sons Joel Whiteside and Samuel Whiteside would fight for the Union in different Illinois infantry units during the American Civil War. Joel received bullet wounds in both thighs during the Battle of Shiloh, which ended his military career, although he and his brother both survived the war.
