= Isaiah Stillman =

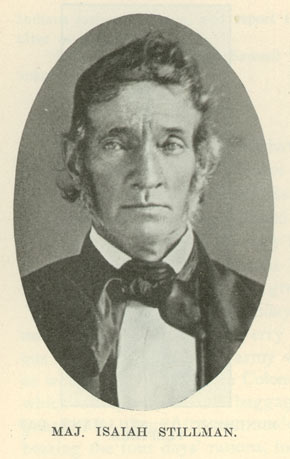
- Major Isaiah Stillman, Illinois militia leader
- Born: c. 1793; Massachusetts
- Died: 15 April 1861 (aged 67–68); Kingston, Peoria County, Illinois
- Military career
- Allegiance: United States of America
- Branch: Illinois Militia
- Rank: Major
- Conflicts: Black Hawk War: Battle of Stillman's Run

Isaiah Stillman (c. 1793–15 April 1861) was an American Cavalry Major who led the Illinois militia in the first armed confrontation of the Black Hawk War against Black Hawk's Sauk Indian Band. The first armed confrontation would be named Battle of Old Man's Creek, but would later be named Stillman's Run after him.

Isaiah Stillman was born and raised in the state of Massachusetts, but he left the east and traveled to Illinois to become a trader of pots, pans, and other items. For a time, he lived in Coopers Creek Landing in Fulton County, before deciding to join the Illinois militia as a captain at the age of 35 in 1827. By the early part of 1832, Isaiah had attained the rank of Brigadier General-elect. With this new position, he gained the responsibility of defending everything west of the Illinois River. This land was mostly an empty place, with few First Nation's tribes and settlements. In April 1832, Governor of Illinois John Reynolds ordered Stillman to raise a battalion for the Illinois militia. He was unable to recruit a full battalion, so he was made a major rather than a general. The next year after Black Hawk War, he was promoted to general.

He died in Kingston Mines, Illinois on April 15, 1861, at the age of 67. He is buried in Peoria.
