= Dixon's Ferry =

Coordinates: 41.845°N 89.484°W

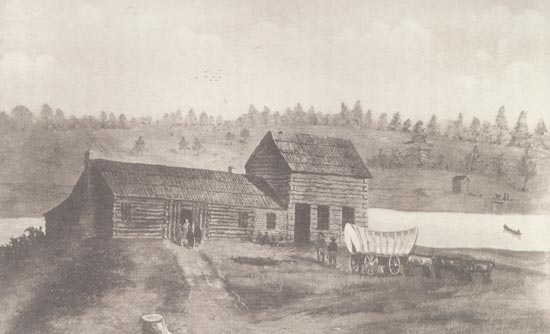
Dixon's Ferry on the Rock River, pre-1903.

Dixon's Ferry was the former name for Dixon, Illinois, United States. It was located on the bank of the Rock River near present-day Illinois Route 26. John Dixon operated a rope ferry service to transport mail from Peoria to Galena, and he also established the first post office. The surrounding settlement was known as Dixon's Ferry.

There was a fort named Fort Dixon by the town which served as the town's protection during the Black Hawk War.

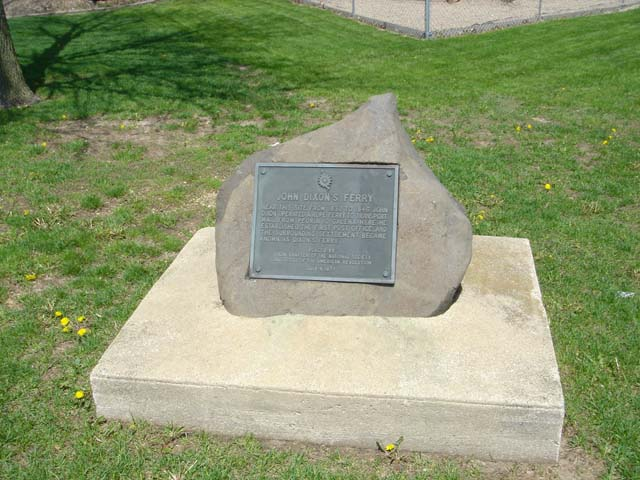
Plaque marking the site of Dixon's Ferry.
