= Attack at Ament's Cabin =

Event during Black Hawk War in Illinois, USA

Coordinates: 41°28′17″N 89°23′43″W

- Part of the Black Hawk War
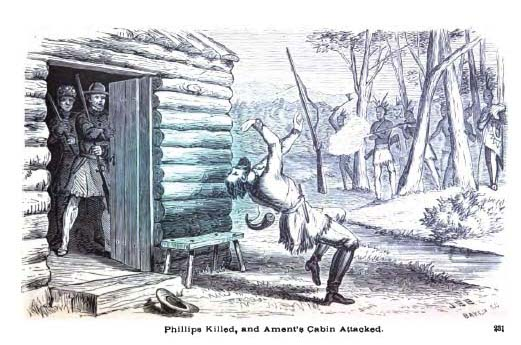
- An 1887 depiction of the attack
Date	June 17 or June 18, 1832
Location	Near present day Dover, Illinois.
Result	No military result

Belligerents
United States	Potawatomi

Strength
7	30

Casualties and losses
1 KIA	0

The Attack at Ament's Cabin was an event during the Black Hawk War that occurred on 17 or June 18, 1832. The cabin site, in present-day Bureau County, Illinois, was settled by John L. Ament and his brother in 1829, although Ament's brother was quickly bought out by Elijah Phillips. After the 1832 Black Hawk War broke out, Ament and Phillips evacuated the site but later returned to collect belongings. On the morning of 17 or 18 June, the men were attacked by a band of Potawatomi, led by Mike Girty, probably those responsible for the Indian Creek massacre in May. Phillips was killed and the other men took shelter in Ament's cabin. Soldiers from Hennepin arrived after the attack and found Phillips' badly tomahawked body where he had fallen. They set off in a short pursuit of the attackers but eventually returned to Hennepin, Illinois with Phillips' remains.

== Background ==
The site of Ament's cabin was settled in 1829 when John L. Ament and his brother Justin staked claim on adjacent claims Berlin and Dover Townships, in present-day Bureau County, Illinois. Shortly after settling, Elijah Phillips bought Justin Ament's land and built his own cabin. West of Ament's and Phillips' settlement was a large Native American sugar camp, part of this camp was included in Ament's claim. The camp was a place where Native Americans lived during the winter and spring on an annual basis. The group, a band that included about a dozen families, was led by a chief named Meommuse. By the time Ament's cabin was constructed, the group had been making sugar at the location for 42 consecutive years. When the area was settled by Ament and Phillips, relations between the settlers and the Native American tribes began to deteriorate.

As a consequence of an 1804 treaty between the Governor of Indiana Territory and a group of Sauk and Fox leaders regarding land settlement, the Sauk and Fox tribes vacated their lands in Illinois and moved west of the Mississippi in 1828. However, Sauk Chief Black Hawk and others disputed the treaty, claiming that the full tribal councils had not been consulted, nor did those representing the tribes have authorization to cede lands. Angered by the loss of his birthplace, between 1830–31 Black Hawk led a number of incursions across the Mississippi River, but was persuaded to return west each time without bloodshed. In April 1832, encouraged by promises of alliance with other tribes and the British, he again moved his so-called "British Band" of around 1,000 warriors and non-combatants into Illinois. Finding no allies, he attempted to return to Iowa, but the undisciplined Illinois militia's actions led to the Battle of Stillman's Run. A number of other engagements followed, and the militias of Michigan Territory and Illinois were mobilized to hunt down Black Hawk's Band. The conflict became known as the Black Hawk War.

== Prelude ==
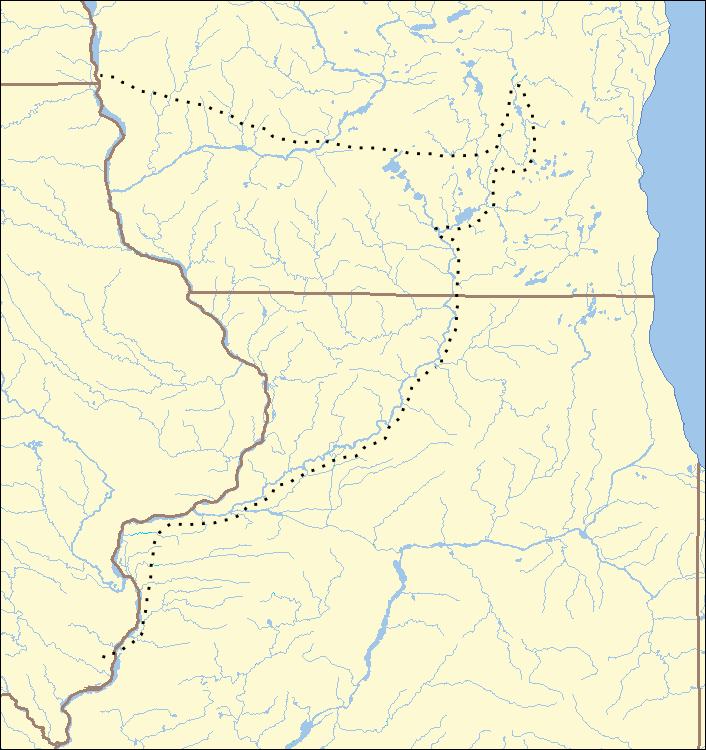
Map of Black Hawk War sites
Battle (with name) Fort / settlement Native village
Symbols are wikilinked to article

Before the raid at the cabin, animosity already existed between Ament and the band under Meommuse at the sugar camp. Meommuse's historical use of the camp contributed to his and his band's anger over Ament building his cabin in such close vicinity. The bad blood had already boiled over at least once: Ament had shot one of the band's dogs. Prior to the attack, both Ament and Phillips were warned by Potawatomi chief Shabbona of impending danger to the settlers along Bureau Creek. Heeding the warnings, the men had fled, with their families, leaving their goods and livestock behind. Eventually, it was decided that it was safe to return to the settlement to gather the deserted possessions.

About two weeks after fleeing their cabins, a party of seven men, Elijah Phillips, J. Hodges, Sylvester Brigham, John L. Ament, Aaron Gunn, James G. Forristall and a 16-year-old named Ziba Dimmick left Hennepin, Illinois for the small settlement along Bureau Creek where Ament's cabin was located. Phillips was a member of the militia, enlisted as a private in Captain George B. Willis' company out of Putnam County, Illinois – it is unclear whether any of the other men were militia members. The party left on either 16 or June 17 (older histories do not agree on the exact day) and reached their destination in the early evening. The men arrived at Ament's cabin, 1.5 miles (2.4 km) north of present-day Dover, ate dinner and spent the rainy night at the site.

The band at the sugar camp was notified of the settlers' return to the cabins by a young warrior who had observed them arriving. While the settlers ate dinner, a group from the sugar camp quietly concealed themselves in the underbrush and approached Ament's cabin undetected. There were Potawatomi among the band, one of whom was a son to Chief Meommuse. The group has been named responsible for the May 21 Indian Creek massacre and the murder of a minister, Adam Payne, on the road to Ottawa. This particular group of Potawatomi was under the leadership of Mike Girty. As the men socialized after dinner, the Potawatomi waited in the brush, intending to attack the settlers as they left the cabin, but as they waited it began to rain. The band waited in the rain for many hours but the storm did not let up and they decided to abandon their plans for attack until the next morning.

== Attack ==
The next morning, either June 17 or 18, the band of about 30 Native Americans returned to their hidden positions and awaited the settlers. When the settlers awoke, Brigham and Phillips went onto the porch of Ament's cabin where they conversed for a few minutes, failing to notice the moccasin tracks around the property. Phillips decided to go to his cabin, about a half mile (.8 km) from Ament's property, to finish a letter to his parents. Brigham, intending to accompany Phillips, entered his cabin for a moment, and once inside he heard the sound of musket fire outside. Phillips, mortally wounded, fell to the ground, struck by two musket balls. The band of raiding Native Americans immediately descended upon him with their tomahawks.

The other settlers rushed into the cabin as the raiding warriors surrounded the house. They shut the door and aimed their weapons through cracks in the walls. Two of the men stood near the doorway with their weapons, and Hodges' weapon came into contact with Girty's chest causing him, and his group, to retreat into the woods. Young Dimmick, anxious to the point of begging to leave, was then dispatched to Hennepin by horseback for help. The men at the cabin expected Dimmick to be shot as soon as he rode off, but he crossed the open prairie unscathed. Dimmick made the 16 mile (25.7 km) journey and arrived in Hennepin to report the attack.

== Aftermath ==
Dimmick's report of the incident was not well received by the people of Hennepin; it caused a general panic as citizens were convinced that Black Hawk's entire British Band was poised to attack the town. In Hennepin that day, were two companies of Rangers, and a call for volunteers went out among them to aid the settlers at Ament's cabin. Volunteers were gathered, and though some were reluctant to go, the rescue group of between 30 and 70 men started toward Ament's cabin.

When the Rangers arrived at the cabin site they found the Ament and the other men safely barricaded inside the cabin. Ament waved a white flag through the roof to signal the soldiers as they approached. Outside, they found the undisturbed body of Phillips lying where he had fallen, in the dooryard with his face upturned. He had been shot through the left side of his chest and through the stomach. His body was badly tomahawked, and had slashes across one eye and his neck. He had not, however, been scalped. The Rangers formed a small detachment and set off in pursuit of the attackers but they soon gave up and returned to Hennepin with Phillips' remains. The funeral took place the next day and was attended by citizens and soldiers alike.
