= Clack Stone =

American militia captain

- Military career
- Allegiance: United States of America
- Branch: Illinois militia
- Service years: 1832
- Rank: Captain
- Commands: company of the 27th Regiment Illinois Militia
- Conflicts: Battle of Apple River Fort (Black Hawk War)
- Other work: General store proprietor

Clack Stone (fl. 1827–1839) was the elected captain of the "Apple River" Company, 27th Regiment Illinois Militia during the Black Hawk War of 1832. He was in charge of a company mustered into service in May 1832 from Jo Daviess County, Illinois. Stone's company manned Apple River Fort, a log stockade and blockhouse—a reconstruction of which is located on knoll just east of present-day Elizabeth Stone provided leadership during two war-related incidents. In the first event, some horses were stolen from the fort during the night of June 17, in the prelude to the June 18 action known then as "Stephenson's Fight". Today, the fight is erroneously known as the Battle of Waddams Grove. The second event was on the afternoon of June 24: an intense battle known as the Battle of Apple River Fort. After the war, Stone built and operated a general store and helped Redding Bennett, John D. Winters, and others survey and lay out lot lines for the proposed village of Elizabeth. He also owned and apparently operated for a time the "Eagle Saloon" in Galena. Stone laid claim to numerous land parcels located west of the present village. He remained in today's Jo Daviess County with his common law wife Delilah Hickman for several years, then moved south to Union Grove in what is now Carroll County, Illinois.

== Early life ==
John D. Winters moved from Kentucky or Tennessee to central Illinois, and then to Jo Daviess County in 1827. Sometime after this, Winters and Clack Stone purchased a tract of land 127 feet (38.7 m) above the waters of the Apple River.

== Military service ==
In April 1832, encouraged by promises of alliance with other tribes and the British, Sauk Chief Black Hawk moved his so-called "British Band" of around 1,000 warriors and non-combatants into Illinois. The conflict that followed became known as the Black Hawk War. Between May and June 1832, eight companies were mustered into service in the volunteer Illinois Militia under the command of Colonel James M. Strode. All eight companies of the 27th Regiment of Illinois Militia were from Jo Daviess County. One of the eight companies in Strode's 27th was a 47-man unit eventually commanded by Captain Clack Stone. Stone's company was mustered into service by order of Illinois Governor John Reynolds on May 15, 1832, one day after the first engagement of the war at Stillman's Run. Initially, Stone's company, based at the Apple River settlement, was commanded by Captain Vance L. Davidson. When Davidson left for the Plum River settlement at present-day Savanna, Stone took over command. One of the longest serving groups of volunteers during the war, the 27th Regiment was mustered out of service on September 6, 1832.

Upon hearing of Black Hawk's return, settlers throughout northern Illinois and southern Wisconsin hastily constructed forts. The Apple River Fort was constructed by the early settlers at present-day Elizabeth for protection during the war. At the onset of the Black Hawk War, settlers in southern Wisconsin and northern Illinois constructed a series of hastily built forts; Apple River Fort was one of the forts erected after the militia's defeat at Stillman's Run. The small fort was completed on May 22, 1832 under the supervision of Stone, one week after the battle at Stillman's Run. The Apple River settlement, at the time of the fort's completion, was home to about 40 settlers.

Stone was in command at the fort during two war-related incidents. In the days immediately preceding June 18, 1832, Apple River Fort's stables were broken into and horses were stolen during the night. This incident was one of several around that time which led Illinois militia officer James W. Stephenson to clash with British Band warriors at Waddams Grove on June 18. On June 24, the Battle of Apple River Fort commenced at the fort. Approximately 150–200 Sauk and Fox warriors under the command of Black Hawk attacked the fort, which was defended by about 25 militia. The militia was shorthanded during the battle, as most of the fort's detachment were not present. Inside the fort, the people of the nearby settlement had taken refuge. One woman, Elizabeth Armstrong, was singled out for her bravery after the battle. She rallied the fort's women to assist during the battle by making musket balls and reloading weapons. Fierce fighting ensued for at least 45 minutes with both sides exchanging heavy gunfire. Believing the fort to be more heavily defended than it was, Black Hawk and his band eventually retreated. Casualties were few, given the intensity of the battle. Militia member George Herclerode was shot in the neck or head early in the battle and died; it has been documented that he was killed while peering over the stockade wall's pickets. The number of Sauk casualties is unknown.

== Later life ==
Immediately following the Black Hawk War, Clack Stone opened a store near the site of present-day Elizabeth. The store was directly across the street from the house of John D. Winters, who established a tavern around the same time. In 1839, surveyor Charles R. Bennett laid out the village of Elizabeth on Winters' and Stone's land. The original village had twelve named streets.
