= Elijah Phillips =

Early Illinois settler

- Born: April 11, 1809; Fitzwilliam, New Hampshire
- Died: June 18, 1832 (aged 23) near Dover, Illinois
- Military career
- Allegiance: United States of America
- Branch: Illinois Militia
- Service years: 1832
- Rank: Private
- Conflicts: Attack at Ament's Cabin (Black Hawk War)

Elijah Phillips (April 11, 1809 – June 18, 1832) was an early Illinois settler who was killed during the 1832 Black Hawk War, a conflict between Euro-American settlers and elements of the Sauk and Meskwaki nations under Sauk leader Black Hawk. Phillips was born in New Hampshire and settled near Dover, Illinois around 1830. During the war he, along with other settlers, fled their settlements in fear of Native American raids. In June 1832 Phillips returned to his cabin with six other men to retrieve some belongings. The group was attacked early one morning and Phillips was killed.

== Early life ==
Elijah Phillips was born in Fitzwilliam, New Hampshire on April 11, 1809, son, and one of ten total children of Elijah Phillips. Phillips left New Hampshire for Illinois at a young age in 1830. He traveled by foot, and steamboat, passing over Lake Erie and the Erie Canal in his journey. He arrived in Illinois, where he met his friends, James G. Forristall and Sylvester Brigham, who had already established themselves and erected a log cabin. This site, in present-day Bureau County, Illinois near Dover, was where Phillips decided to settle.

== In Illinois ==
Elijah Phillips settled a site near Berlin and Dover Townships, in present-day Bureau County, Illinois. The area was first settled by John L. Ament and his brother Justin, shortly after the pair settled, Justin sold his land to Phillips. Phillips erected his own cabin about one and a half miles (2.4 km) from John Ament's cabin.

== Death ==
When the Black Hawk War erupted between elements of the Sauk and Meskwaki and the Illinois and Michigan Territorial Militia in 1832 settler families had fled, leaving their goods and livestock behind. Eventually, it was decided that it was safe to return to the settlement to tend to the deserted possessions. About two weeks after fleeing the site, a party of seven men, Elijah Phillips, J. Hodges, Sylvester Brigham, John L. Ament, Aaron Gunn, James G. Forristall and a 16-year-old named Ziba Dimmick left Hennepin, Illinois for the small settlement along Bureau Creek where Ament's cabin was located. Phillips was a member of the militia, enlisted as a private in Captain George B. Willis' company out of Putnam County, Illinois – it is unclear whether any of the other men were militia members.

The next morning, either June 17 or June 18, the band of about 30 Native Americans returned to their hidden positions of the day before and awaited the settlers. When the settlers awoke, Brigham and Phillips went onto the porch of Ament's cabin where they conversed for a few minutes, failing to notice the moccasin tracks around the property. Phillips decided to go to his cabin, about a half mile (.8 km) from Ament's property, to finish a letter to his parents. Brigham, intending to accompany Phillips, entered his cabin for a moment, and when he did he heard the crack of musket fire outside. Phillips dropped to the ground, struck by two musket balls, and the band of raiding Native Americans immediately descended upon him with their tomahawks. Phillips' date of death is recorded as June 18, 1832 in the 1888 book The History of Fitzwilliam, New Hampshire, from 1752-1887.
