= Attacks at Fort Blue Mounds =

Part of the Black Hawk War

Coordinates: 43°1′19″N 89°48′41″W

- Part of the Black Hawk War
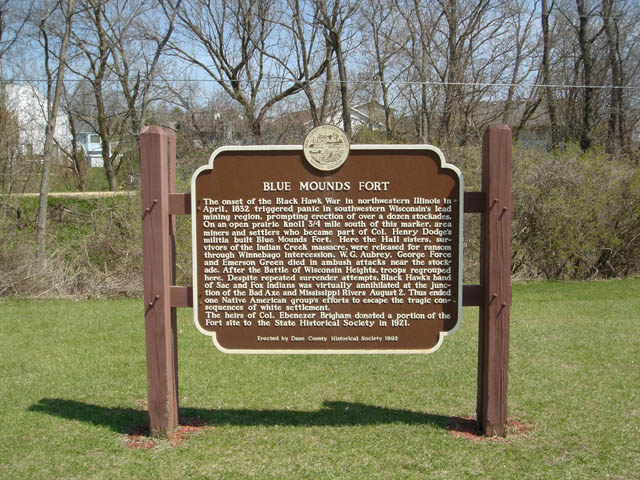
- Marker near the site of Fort Blue Mounds.
Date	June 6 and June 20, 1832
Location	Near present-day Blue Mounds, Wisconsin

Belligerents
United States	Ho-Chunk

Strength
	50-100

Casualties and losses
3 KIA	

The attacks at Fort Blue Mounds were two separate incidents which occurred on June 6 and 20, 1832, as part of the Black Hawk War. In the first incident, area residents attributed the killing of a miner to a band of Ho-Chunk warriors, and concluded that more Ho-Chunk planned to join Black Hawk in his war against white settlers. The second incident occurred east of the fort as a Sauk raiding party, estimated by eyewitnesses to be as large as 100 warriors, attacked two militiamen who were investigating noises heard the night before. Two members of the militia stationed at Blue Mounds were killed in the attack, and both their bodies were badly mutilated.

The attacks followed an increase in tension after the Hall sisters were released at Fort Blue Mounds on June 1. The sisters had been kidnapped during the Indian Creek massacre in May and were brought to Blue Mounds by a party of Ho-Chunk. Militia leader Henry Dodge became suspicious of the Ho-Chunk and took them prisoner, though they were later released as tension between the Ho-Chunk and white settlers increased. The attacks also lent credence to the belief that more Ho-Chunk were set to join Black Hawk's war against white settlers in Illinois and Michigan Territory. Though other attacks on the fort were expected, they never happened and Fort Blue Mounds served as a supply center for the remaining days of the war.

== Background ==
As a consequence of an 1804 treaty between the Governor of Indiana Territory and a group of Sauk and Fox leaders regarding land settlement the Sauk and Fox tribes vacated their lands in Illinois in 1828 and moved west of the Mississippi River. However, Sauk Chief Black Hawk and others disputed the treaty, claiming that the full tribal councils had not been consulted, nor did those representing the tribes have authorization to cede lands. Angered by the loss of his birthplace, Black Hawk led a number of incursions across the Mississippi River beginning in 1830, but each time was persuaded, without bloodshed, to return west. In April 1832, encouraged by promises of alliance with other tribes and the British, he again moved his so-called "British Band" of around 1,000 warriors and civilians into Illinois. A number of other engagements followed, and the state militias of Wisconsin and Illinois were mobilized to hunt down Black Hawk's band, the conflict that ensued became known as the Black Hawk War.

== Prelude ==
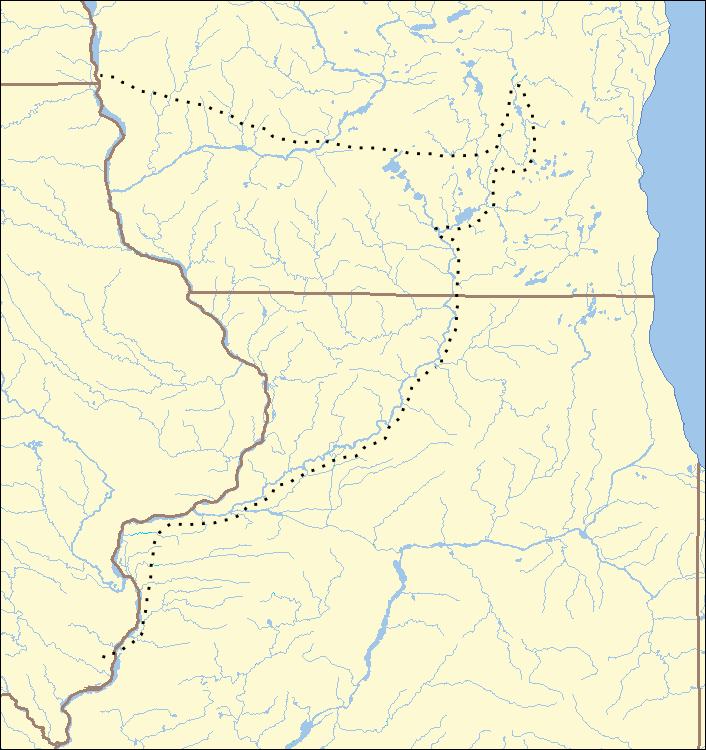
Map of Black Hawk War sites
Battle (with name) Fort / settlement Native village
Symbols are wikilinked to article

Upon hearing of Black Hawk's return, settlers throughout northern Illinois and southern Wisconsin hastily constructed forts. Construction on a fort began at Ebeneezer Brigham's Moundville settlement (now Blue Mounds, Wisconsin) on May 10. As construction of the fort commenced Black Hawk found no allies so he attempted to return to Iowa, but events overtook him and led to the Battle of Stillman's Run. The battle likely caused the builders of Fort Blue Mounds to accelerate the pace of construction.

One week after the clash at Stillman's Run, on May 21, 1832, the Indian Creek massacre occurred well south of Fort Blue Mounds, near present-day Ottawa, Illinois. During the attack, two teenage girls were kidnapped by a raiding band of Potawatomi. The girls, Sylvia and Rachel Hall, were released on June 1 at Fort Blue Mounds by the party of Ho-Chunk who had helped secure their release; the party included several important chiefs. Commander of the Michigan Territory militia Henry Dodge arrived with a company to retrieve the girls but became suspicious of the Ho-Chunk and took them prisoner in an attempt to secure the alliance and good behavior of other Ho-Chunk in the vicinity of Blue Mounds. The chiefs were soon released but friction between white settlers at Moundville and the Ho-Chunk residing in the area increased. Indian Agent Henry Gratiot tried to calm the situation by appeasing the Ho-Chunk through gifts. Despite Gratiot's attempts, the tension exploded into violence a few days later.

== Attacks ==
The first incident near Fort Blue Mounds occurred when William Griffith Aubrey was attacked and killed by Native American warriors on June 6, 1832. According to one witness statement, directly preceding the first attack at Fort Blue Mounds on June 6, there was an argument between William Aubrey's wife and a Ho-Chunk man. During the exchange the Ho-Chunk man threatened to kill her husband. Aubrey was a miner who was working for Brigham about 1½ miles away from Fort Blue Mounds when he was attacked. He and Jefferson Smith were detailed to retrieve water from a spring near the fort when they were ambushed by a small party of warriors. Aubrey was shot twice and stabbed through the neck with a spear. His companion, though shot three times, managed to escape with his life. Smith fled back to the fort, leaving his gun and horse behind. At the fort, the settlers correctly guessed that the attackers were Ho-Chunk and not the warriors of Black Hawk's "British Band," which was 40 miles (64 km) away at Lake Kegonsa.

The second attack occurred on June 20, 1832, two weeks after the first incident. In the attack, a large Sauk war party attacked Blue Mounds and two members of the militia, Emerson Green and George Force, were killed. Eyewitness accounts estimated the size of the group between 50-100 warriors. The night before the second attack of June 20 strange noises were heard in the vicinity of the fort. Force and Green had left the fort, on horseback, to investigate the previous night's disturbances and were several miles east of Fort Blue Mounds when they came across Black Hawk's band, guided to the fort by sympathetic Ho-Chunk. Force was killed immediately but Green broke for the fort and almost made it back to safety when, in view of the fort's occupants, his horse was shot out from underneath him. Green was surrounded by the war party and killed, eyewitness accounts indicate that his body was badly mutilated.

== Aftermath ==
Following the murder of Aubrey, people in the area quickly suspected that the Ho-Chunk were involved which exacerbated the fear that more from the Ho-Chunk Nation were set to join Chief Black Hawk's band against the white settlers in Michigan Territory and Illinois. With the loyalty of the Ho-Chunk in question the possibility of a two-front war emerged. After the deaths of Green and Force, U.S. interrogators questioned two Ho-Chunk warriors they had captured. The braves, members of the Prophet's Band, took credit for the killings, even boasting of them.

The location of Aubrey's death was in Michigan Territory near present-day Blue Mounds, Wisconsin. Following his death, mounted troops and riders from the fort traced the band responsible for the attack to a recently abandoned camp, and then to the Wisconsin River, where the search ended. Aubrey was buried on a high piece of land overlooking the fort from the northeast.

Green's body was buried at the fort but Force's remains laid on the prairie for four days before they were retrieved; the fort's residents were too frightened to venture far from the building. On June 24 General Henry Dodge and Captain James H. Gentry arrived at Fort Blue Mounds with part of Gentry's company. Their purpose was to conduct reconnaissance operations but they ended up finding the body of Lieutenant Force beneath a tree about two miles (3 km) east of the fort. Early histories indicate Force's body was badly mutilated and missing a "part." Force was buried near the fort, along the main trail about two miles (3 km) east of the fort.

Though Brigham fully expected an all-out attack on Fort Blue Mounds following the incidents, it never came. The only violence that befell the occupants of the fort was that perpetrated on those who left its confines on June 6 and June 20. Dodge left a detachment at the fort for a time but after the June 20 attack the fort was never again a target during the Black Hawk War. Until the end of the war, Fort Blue Mounds served primarily as a supply center for the militia as they continued their pursuit of Black Hawk across Wisconsin.
