= Zearing =

Zearing may refer to the following places in the United States:

- Zearing, Illinois
- Zearing, Iowa
