= Battle of Apple River Fort =

1832 battle of the Black Hawk War

Coordinates: 42°19′0″N 90°13′23″W

- Part of the Black Hawk War
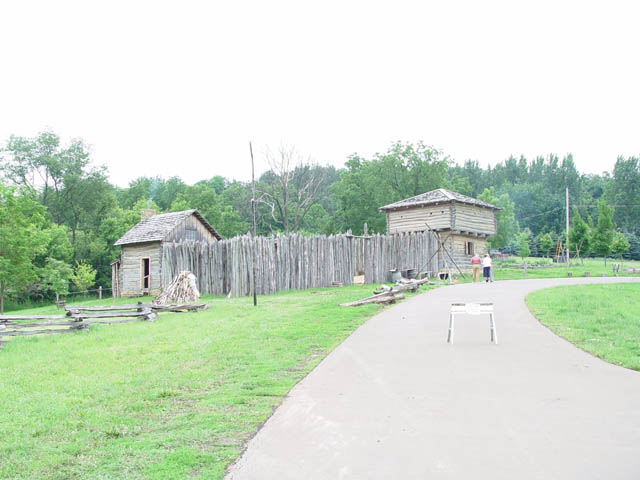
- Reconstructed Apple River Fort, near its original site
Date	June 24, 1832
Location	Near present day Elizabeth, Illinois
Result	United States victory

Belligerents
United States	Sauk/Meskwaki

Commanders and leaders
Captain Clack Stone/Illinois Militia	Black Hawk

Strength
28-30	150-200

Casualties and losses
1 KIA; 2 WIA	Unknown

The Battle of Apple River Fort, occurred on the late afternoon of June 24, 1832 at the Apple River Fort, near present-day Elizabeth, Illinois, when Black Hawk and 200 of his "British Band" of Sauk and Meskwaki were surprised by a group of four messengers en route from Galena, Illinois. One of the couriers was wounded in the thigh as the riders quickly made for the protection of the nearby stockade. Courier Fred Dixon lagged behind and provided cover for his comrades. The other couriers rode ahead to warn some 70 settlers of the approaching Sauk and Meskwaki, thus saving their lives. The small company of militia at the fort, about 28-30 men and boys led by Captain Clack Stone, fought off Black Hawk's 150-man war party in an action that lasted about an hour. The withering pace of the gunfire eventually convinced Black Hawk that the fort was too heavily defended to lead a direct attack. He considered burning the fort, then switched to raiding cabins of foodstuffs, clothing and cooking utensils. In the gathering darkness, Black Hawk and his war party retreated.

After the battle, some of the fort defenders won praise for their efforts to repel the Indian attack. Among them were: Elizabeth Winters, Rebecca Hitt, Sarah Vanvoltinburg, and Elizabeth Armstrong. Mrs. Armstrong rallied the 40 or so women and children who had taken shelter inside the fort. The women and children were divided into two groups: one to mold rifle balls and another to roll paper cartridges and fill them with a measure of gunpowder into paper cartridges. Some of the married women reload weapons so that the militia could increase the pace of their fire. Courier George Harkleroad was struck in the neck and mortally wounded: the fort's only fatality. Native casualties remain unknown, although some defenders later reported blood on the ground and inside a nearby building.

For some time afterward, the old fort was used by local squatters. The former battlefield and the fort remains were sold in 1847. The new owner re-purposed many of the timbers from the fort to build a livestock barn. What remained was burned. Today, a replica fort was built near the original site in the late 1990s and still stands in the modern Village of Elizabeth, IL. The site is managed by the Illinois Department of Natural Resources as "Apple River Fort State Historic Site."

== Background ==
As a consequence of the 1804 Treaty of St. Louis between William H. Harrison the Governor of Indiana Territory and a group of Sauk and Meskwaki leaders regarding land settlement, the Sauk and Meskwaki tribes vacated their lands in Illinois and moved west of the Mississippi in 1828. However, the Sac's principle warrior Black Hawk and others disputed the treaty, claiming that the full tribal councils had not been consulted, nor did those representing the tribes have authorization to cede lands. Angered by the loss of his birthplace, between 1830–31 Black Hawk led a number of incursions across the Mississippi River, but was persuaded to return west each time without bloodshed. In April 1832, encouraged by promises of alliance with other Great Lakes tribes and supplies from the British in Canada, he again moved his so-called "British Band" of around 500 warriors and a like number of families and non-combatants into Illinois. Finding no allies among the local Ho Chunk, he attempted to return to Iowa, but was temporarily stopped by the presence of several companies of militia. As night fell, the undisciplined Illinois militia fled before Black Hawk's warriors in a skirmish known today as Battle of Stillman's Run. A number of other engagements followed, and the militias of Michigan Territory and Illinois were mobilized to hunt down Black Hawk's Band. The conflict became known as the Black Hawk War.

The period between Stillman's Run and the Battle of Apple River Fort was filled with war-related activity and events. A series of attacks at Buffalo Grove, the Plum River settlement, Fort Blue Mounds and one of the conflict's most infamous incidents: the Indian Creek massacre, all took place between mid-May and late June 1832. The week preceding the Battle of Apple River Fort was an important turning point for the militia: between June 16–18 two small but important fights occurred. One was known as "Stephenson's Fight'" today incorrectly called Waddams Grove and the other at Horseshoe Bendin present-day Wisconsin, played a key role in changing public perception about the militia after its defeat at Stillman's Run.

== Prelude ==
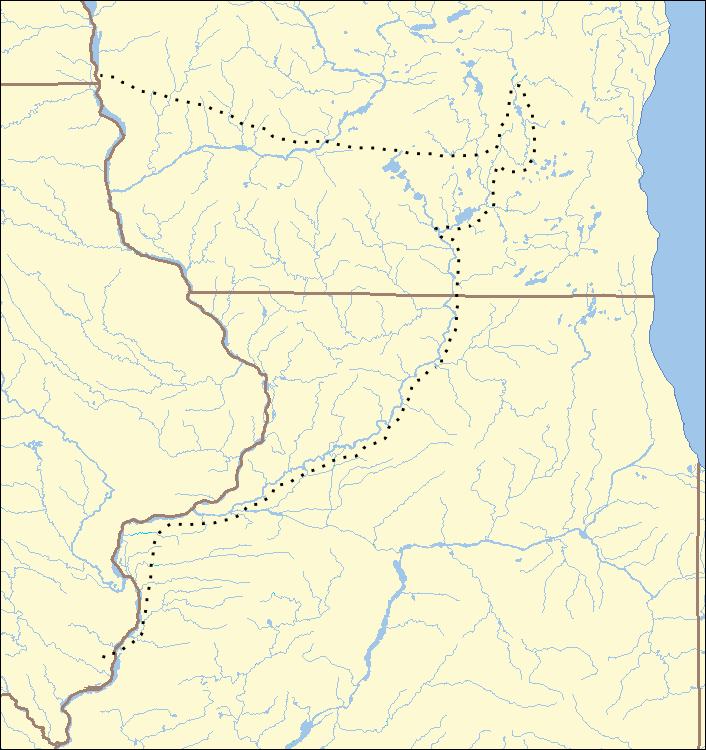
Map of Black Hawk War sites
Battle (with name) Fort / settlement Native village
Symbols are wikilinked to article

Following the militia's disastrous defeat at Stillman's Run on May 14, settlers in the lead-mining region around Galena panicked; many left the area altogether. The exaggerated claim that 2,000 "bloodthirsty warriors were sweeping all Northern Illinois with the bosom of destruction" sent terror through the region. At the Apple River Settlement, the situation prompted residents to form a 46-man militia tentatively under Captain Vance L. Davidson. By late May, Davidson was at the Plum River settlement (present-day Savanna, Illinois) and Captain Clack Stone had been elected to command the militia company. The single blockhouse at Apple River Fort was completed around May 22; the stockade was completed sometime later. In the days immediately preceding June 18, 1832, Apple River Fort's horses were raided and stolen during the night. This incident was one of several around that time that led Illinois militia officer James W. Stephenson to clash with a handful of warriors at "Stephenson's Fight" (later erroneously named Waddams Grove on June 18.

On June 24, 1832, a supply wagon loaded with meat and lead bars from Galena arrived at Apple River Fort around noon. Around this time, Black Hawk and his 200-man war party also en route to the fort, had gathered at a gap in Terrapin Ridge. Black Hawk's forces were able to elude detection until the time they opened fire. At around 4 p.m. four couriers from Galena bound for the army camp at Dixon's Ferry arrived at the fort. The fort's occupants were eager to hear their news from Galena and of the conflict with Black Hawk.

There were 28-30 armed militia inside Apple River Fort at the time of the attack. Another 40 women, children and other settlers were resident in the Apple River Settlement. Captain Clack Stone and his officers commanded the fort's defenders. Most of the defenders were members of Stone's militia company augmented by a few civilians. A few of the militia company were away from the stockade and were not present for the battle.

== Battle ==
The four riders from Galena; George Harkleroad, Fred Dixon, Edmund Welch, and J. Kirkpatrick were under orders as a military messengers known as an "express". They were traveling from Galena to Dixon. The men stopped at the fort, consumed a quick dinner, and then continued on their way. The group was about 600 yards (550 m) east of the fort when the only man with a loaded gun, Welch, was ambushed by Black Hawk's advance-guard of about 30 warriors. He was shot in the hip and fell from his horse. His companions aimed their unloaded weapons at the band, putting themselves between the wounded man and his attackers. The group recovered Welch and moved away from their assailants toward the fort. Fred Dixon, covered the retreat of his fellow express men as they raced for the fort. Three of the expressmen gained the safety of the fort, while Dixon fled on horseback towards the Apple River and ended up at the farm of John McDonald, only to find it overrun by Native Americans as well. Dixon then abandoned his horse, waded the river, and managed to gain the road to Galena, where he reported the Apple River Fort to be under attack.

The settlers took shelter inside the fort while the men and boys took up their positions at the portholes inside the fort. A vicious firefight erupted, involving around 150 of Black Hawk's British Band. The battle raged for about an hour with heavy gunfire from both sides. At the battle's onset many of the settlement's women had been huddled in and around the cabins, but several married woman, including Elizabeth Armstrong, rallied the women and older children to provide support to the soldiers. She assigned the unmarried young women, boys, and girls as young as eight years old to such tasks as cutting and rolling gunpowder cartridges and molding rifle balls. The married women reloaded the weapons while the soldiers tried to maintain an increased rate of fire.

The ferocity of the fight convinced Black Hawk that Apple River Fort was strongly defended. He considered burning the fort, but feared the rising smoke would alert other militia in the area. His war-party slackened their fire as braves raided cabins near the fort. Taken were meat, flour, clothing, cooking utensils. Left behind was a paucity of real vandalism. Braves then raided the livestock: horses were run off and pigs and cattle were shot down and the choicest cut of meat taken. In the gathering darkness, Black Hawk quietly withdrew his war party and retreated back to the gap in Terrapin Ridge and gained the Galena Road. Casualties were few, given the intensity of the battle. Courier George Harkleroad was shot in the neck early in the battle and died; it has been documented that he was killed while peering over the stockade wall's pickets. Besides Welch, the only other garrison casualty was Josiah Nutting, who suffered a non-lethal wound to the side of his head. The number of Sauk casualties is unknown.

== Aftermath ==
The defenders at Apple River Fort awaited the next move by Black Hawk, holding their positions through the night, but dawn came without incident. On the day following the battle, June 25, a relief party consisting of two companies of mounted rangers arrived at the fort from Galena . That same day, Black Hawk's war-party encountered Major John Dement and his three-company Spy Battalion at the Second Battle of Kellogg's Grove. Apple River Fort's only fatality, George Harkleroad, was buried near the fort; today no trace of his grave exists.

Elizabeth Armstrong was praised by some as a heroine for her actions during the battle, displaying the kind of courage under fire the militia had so badly lacked during the first months of the Black Hawk War. Her actions, in part, helped the fort's outnumbered defenders give Black Hawk the impression the Apple River Fort was more heavily defended than had been anticipated.

Initially, some writers confused the name of the woman who played such an important role at Apple River Fort; a 1900 collection from the Wisconsin Historical Society misidentified her as "Mrs. Graham." Several years after the fight, an itinerant Methodist minister heard the story of the Apple River Fort fight from a "Mr. Jewel," a man who settled in Jo Daviess County after the Black Hawk War. Jewel told a story of Armstrong "cursing & swearing like a pirate" throughout the battle; so angry that even Black Hawk's warriors purported to hear her. The Methodist minister pronounced such action as "profane" and "a great drawback upon her credit."

The fort was demolished around 1847 and its timbers used to construct a barn. Today, the fort and its three buildings have been reconstructed by the Apple River Fort Historic Foundation. The Apple River Fort Site is listed twice on the U.S. National Register of Historic Places for its military and archaeological significance.

On January 1, 2001, the state of Illinois took over operation of the reconstructed Apple River Fort and its interpretive center. The state now operates the area as the Apple River Fort State Historic Site. Illinois' purchase was funded, in part, through a US$160,000 grant from the state of Illinois.
