= DeKalb massacre =

DeKalb massacre may refer to:

- Johann de Kalb (1721–1780), German soldier shot during the Battle of Camden in South Carolina, 1780
- Indian Creek massacre, 1832, near DeKalb County, Illinois
- Northern Illinois University shooting, 2008
