= Malden, Illinois =

- Village
- Location of Malden in Bureau County, Illinois.
- Coordinates: 41°25′34″N 89°22′21″W
- Country: United States
- State: Illinois
- County: Bureau
- Township: Berlin

Area
  - Total: 0.27 sq mi (0.71 km^{2})
  - Land: 0.27 sq mi (0.71 km^{2})
  - Water: 0 sq mi (0.00 km^{2})
- Elevation: 705 ft (215 m)

Population (2020)
  - Total: 318
  - Density: 1,164.7/sq mi (449.68/km^{2})
- Time zone: UTC-6 (CST)
  - Summer (DST): UTC-5 (CDT)
- ZIP code: 61337
- Area code: 815
- FIPS code: 17-46240
- GNIS feature ID: 2399230

Malden is a village in Bureau County, Illinois, United States. As of the 2020 census, Malden had a population of 318. It is part of the Ottawa, IL Micropolitan Statistical Area.

== Geography ==
According to the 2021 census gazetteer files, Malden has a total area of 0.27 square miles (0.70 km^{2}), all land.

== Demographics ==
Historical population
Census	Pop.	Note	%±
1880	359		—
1890	319		−11.1%
1900	309		−3.1%
1910	255		−17.5%
1920	233		−8.6%
1930	284		21.9%
1940	237		−16.5%
1950	217		−8.4%
1960	258		18.9%
1970	262		1.6%
1980	359		37.0%
1990	370		3.1%
2000	343		−7.3%
2010	362		5.5%
2020	318		−12.2%
U.S. Decennial Census

As of the 2020 census there were 318 people, 152 households, and 104 families residing in the village. The population density was 1,169.12 inhabitants per square mile (451.40/km^{2}). There were 144 housing units at an average density of 529.41 per square mile (204.41/km^{2}). The racial makeup of the village was 94.34% White, 1.89% African American, 1.89% from other races, and 1.89% from two or more races. Hispanic or Latino of any race were 4.40% of the population.

There were 152 households, out of which 38.2% had children under the age of 18 living with them, 46.05% were married couples living together, 11.84% had a female householder with no husband present, and 31.58% were non-families. 21.71% of all households were made up of individuals, and 9.87% had someone living alone who was 65 years of age or older. The average household size was 2.99 and the average family size was 2.70.

The village's age distribution consisted of 28.7% under the age of 18, 4.4% from 18 to 24, 30.4% from 25 to 44, 24.3% from 45 to 64, and 12.2% who were 65 years of age or older. The median age was 33.0 years. For every 100 females, there were 91.2 males. For every 100 females age 18 and over, there were 115.4 males.

The median income for a household in the village was $49,688, and the median income for a family was $64,375. Males had a median income of $34,844 versus $18,750 for females. The per capita income for the village was $20,975. About 19.2% of families and 23.7% of the population were below the poverty line, including 39.4% of those under age 18 and 16.0% of those age 65 or over.

== Education ==
It is in the Malden Community Consolidated School District 84 and the Princeton High School District 500.
