= John C. McKenzie =

American politician (1860–1941)

- McKenzie, c. 1905–1925

Member of the U.S. House of Representatives from Illinois's 13th district
- In office March 4, 1911 – March 4, 1925
- Preceded by: Frank O. Lowden
- Succeeded by: William R. Johnson

Personal details
- Born: February 18, 1860 Elizabeth, Illinois U.S.
- Died: September 17, 1941 (aged 81) Elizabeth, Illinois U.S.
- Party: Republican
- Spouse: Jessie I. Laign (m. 1917)

John Charles McKenzie (February 18, 1860 – September 17, 1941) was a U.S. representative from Illinois.

Born on a farm near Elizabeth, Woodbine Township, Illinois to a Scottish immigrant father, McKenzie attended the common schools, and the normal school at Valparaiso, Indiana. He taught school in Jo Daviess County, Illinois for six years. He engaged in the grain, flour, and feed business. He studied law. He was admitted to the bar in 1890 and commenced the practice of his profession in Elizabeth, Illinois. He served as director of the Elizabeth Exchange Bank. He served as member of the State house of representatives 1892-1896. He served as member of Illinois Claims Commission 1896-1900. He served in the State senate from 1900 until his resignation on May 11, 1911, and was president pro tempore 1903-1905.

Mckenzie was elected as a Republican to the Sixty-second and to the six succeeding Congresses (March 4, 1911 – March 3, 1925). He served as chairman of the Committee on Military Affairs (Sixty-eighth Congress). He was not a candidate for renomination in 1924. He was appointed in 1925 a member of the commission to report the most practical method of utilizing the nitrate plant at Muscle Shoals, Alabama. He resumed the practice of his profession in Elizabeth, Illinois, until his death in that city on September 17, 1941. He was interred in Elizabeth Cemetery.

U.S. House of Representatives
Preceded by Frank O. Lowden	Member of the U.S. House of Representatives from Illinois's 13th congressional district 1911–1925	Succeeded by William R. Johnson
