= Joseph R. Peterson =

American lawyer, farmer, and politician

Member of the Illinois Senate
- In office 1956 – August 26, 1967

Member of the Illinois House of Representatives
- In office 1951–1956

Mayor of Dover, Illinois
- In office 1929–1930

Personal details
- Born: September 21, 1904 near Zearing, Illinois, U.S.
- Died: August 26, 1967 (aged 62) Princeton, Illinois, U.S.
- Party: Republican
- Education: Beloit College (Bachelor's degree)
- Occupation: Politician, lawyer, farmer

Joseph R. Peterson (September 21, 1904 – August 26, 1967) was an American lawyer, farmer, and politician.

Peterson was born on a farm near Zearing, Illinois. In 1911, he moved to a farm near Dover, Illinois, and then settled in Princeton, Illinois, in 1930. Peterson went to the Bureau County public schools. In 1925, Peterson received his bachelor's degree from Beloit College. He then received his law degree from University of Illinois College of Law in 1928. He was admitted to the Illinois bar in 1928 and practiced law in Princeton, Illinois. He served as mayor of Dover, Illinois, in 1929 and 1930. Peterson served as state's attorney of Bureau County from 1936 to 1948 and was a Republican. Peterson served in the Illinois House of Representatives from 1951 to 1956 and in the Illinois Senate from 1956 until his death in 1967. He died at his home in Princeton, Illinois.
