= Leo E. Allen =

American politician (1898–1973)

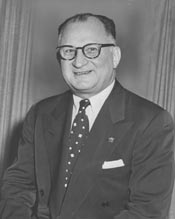

Chair of the House Rules Committee
- In office January 3, 1953 – January 3, 1955
- Preceded by: Adolph J. Sabath
- Succeeded by: Howard W. Smith
- In office January 3, 1947 – January 3, 1949
- Preceded by: Adolph J. Sabath
- Succeeded by: Adolph J. Sabath

Member of the U.S. House of Representatives from Illinois
- In office March 4, 1933 – January 3, 1961
- Preceded by: William R. Johnson
- Succeeded by: John B. Anderson
- Constituency: 13th district (1933-1949); 16th district (1949-1961)

Personal details
- Born: October 5, 1898 Elizabeth, Illinois, U.S.
- Died: January 19, 1973 (aged 74) Galena, Illinois, U.S.
- Party: Republican
- Education: University of Michigan

Leo Elwood Allen (October 5, 1898 – January 19, 1973) was an American politician from Illinois.

Born in Elizabeth, Illinois, Allen's maternal grandparents were German immigrants and his paternal grandfather was from England. He attended public schools and graduated from the University of Michigan in Ann Arbor in 1923. During the First World War, he served as a sergeant in the 123rd Field Artillery Regiment between 1917 and 1919. He taught school in Galena, Illinois in 1922 and 1923 and was clerk of the circuit court of Jo Daviess County from 1924 to 1932. He studied law and was admitted to the bar in 1930, starting a practice in Galena.

Allen was elected as a Republican to the United States House of Representatives in 1932 and would be re-elected thirteen additional times, serving from March 4, 1933, to January 3, 1961. He twice served as chairman of the House Committee on Rules during the two Congresses he served in which the Republicans held majorities, the 80th Congress (1947–1949) and the 83rd Congress (1953–1955). Allen voted in favor of the Civil Rights Acts of 1957 and 1960. Allen declined to seek a fifteenth term in 1960 and retired in Galena, where he died on January 19, 1973. He is buried in Greenwood Cemetery.

U.S. House of Representatives
Preceded by William R. Johnson	Member of the U.S. House of Representatives from Illinois's 13th congressional district March 4, 1933 – January 3, 1949	Succeeded by Ralph E. Church
Preceded by Everett Dirksen	Member of the U.S. House of Representatives from Illinois's 16th congressional district January 3, 1949 – January 3, 1961	Succeeded by John B. Anderson
