= Adam Payne =

American minister (1781–1832)

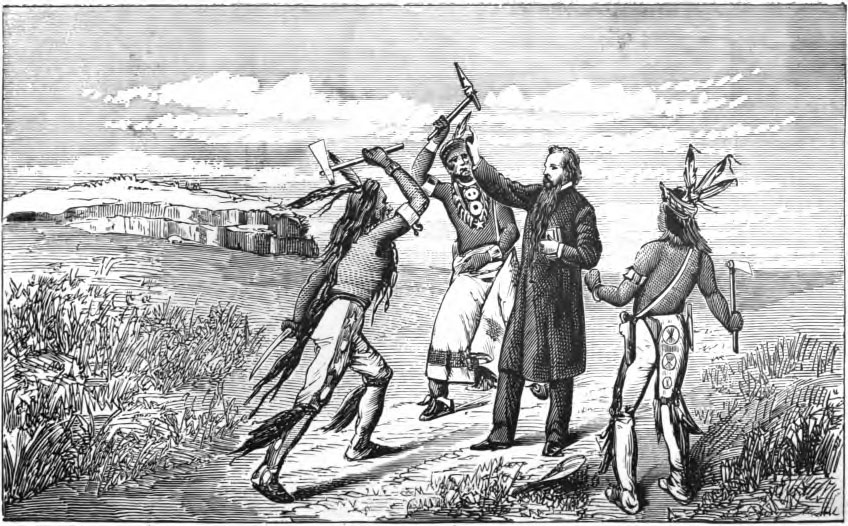
- An 1878 artist's depiction of Payne's murder
- Title: Reverend; Elder

Personal life
- Born: 1781 Somerset County, Pennsylvania, United States
- Died: May 23, 1832 (aged 50–51) near present-day Marseilles, Illinois, United States

Religious life
- Religion: Schwarzenau Brethren

Senior posting
- Based in: United States

Adam Payne (1781 – May 23, 1832) was an itinerant minister who enjoyed success preaching among the Potawatomi people in Illinois and was killed by Native Americans during the Black Hawk War of 1832.

== Early life ==
Adam Payne was born in Somerset County, Pennsylvania, United States in 1781 and moved to Ohio in 1799. Payne remained in Ohio for about 13 years, after which he emigrated to Kentucky. In 1820 he moved to Indiana, and his fascination with Illinois eventually led him to locate his family there. In the spring of 1831 he relocated to Illinois on a claim five miles (8 km) west of Holderman's Grove near the Fox River.

== Description ==
Adam Payne has been described as eccentric and talented in his work as a minister. Physical descriptions of Payne remarked on his long, jet, raven or crow black hair which flowed down onto and covered his broad shoulders. He was a large man who was described as imposing. He also wore a long beard, black like his hair, which was similar to a beard his brother, Aaron Payne, wore. His voice was powerful and booming, and contributed to his success as a preacher among the Native American tribes.

== Ministerial career ==
Payne was ordained an Elder in the Schwarzenau Brethren, known as the New Lights or Dunkers, but eventually dissolved his connections with any church to preach independently. He traveled the United States preaching mostly to large, outdoor crowds, following the model of Lorenzo Dow. During the summer 1830, Payne preached to several bands of Native Americans successfully. His success preaching among the Native Americans would make him less wary to travel into the frontier when the Black Hawk War started in 1832. Payne's oratory skill gained him notoriety throughout the United States.

== Death ==
Two days after the May 21 Indian Creek massacre, the Payne was traveling by horseback on what would later become the Frank & Walker stagecoach route, from Chicago to Ottawa. Payne passed through several areas including Holderman's Grove, Lisbon and Plainfield, Illinois. At Plainfield Payne was met by a friend, Johnathan Wilson, who warned him of danger to individuals traveling the Illinois frontier alone. Payne was at first persuaded and turned back toward Chicago at Wilson's urgings.

As he traveled toward Chicago, Payne changed his mind, ignored the warnings and turned back toward Ottawa. Payne's journey was uneventful until he approached Holderman's Grove. Payne approached the grove, about halfway between Plainfield and Ottawa, when he was ambushed by a waiting war party of Native Americans. Based on later Native American summaries of the attack on Payne it is likely that it was carried out by the same band responsible for the Indian Creek massacre.

They immediately fired their weapons and Payne was wounded through the chest. He turned his horse to flee but it was also wounded in the encounter and after a chase of about 15 miles (24 km) it fell dead beneath him. Unarmed, Payne was overtaken by the attackers and purportedly decapitated. However, one witness to the body's discovery indicated that he was only scalped and his head remained attached to his body. In the index to his 2006 book, Black Hawk: The Battle for the Heart of America, Kerry A. Trask refers to the incident as the Holderman's Grove raid.

Another 1887 account also indicates Payne was decapitated, emphasizing that while his head was placed on a stake in the ground, his scalp remained untouched. In his 1878 work, Memories of Shaubena, also describes a decapitation. Matson states that after the head was severed the band returned to their camp, head in tow. Upon returning to the camp the band placed the head on the stake, as described by Trask and others, and began dancing around the war trophy. The leader of the band, Mike Girty, was away from the camp with a group of scouts at the time, when he returned he noticed the head on the stake and first assumed it to be a woman. He examined it further, realized it was his old friend Adam Payne, and was immediately overcome with grief and anger. He tried to attack Payne's assailant with a tomahawk but was prevented from doing so by others in the group.
