= Towaunonne =

Towaunonne was a Sauk chief aligned with Black Hawk's British Band during the 1832 Black Hawk War.

== British Band ==
Towaunonne was a Sauk and one of seven civil chiefs aligned with Black Hawk's British Band during the Black Hawk War in 1832.
