= William Richard Johnson =

American politician

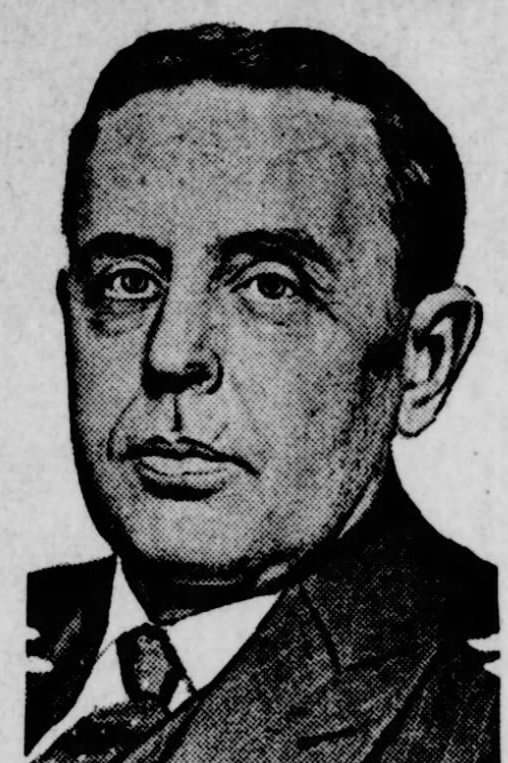
- Johnson in 1924

Member of the U.S. House of Representatives from Illinois's 13th district
- In office March 4, 1925 – March 3, 1933
- Preceded by: John C. McKenzie
- Succeeded by: Leo E. Allen

Personal details
- Born: May 15, 1875 Rock Island, Illinois, U.S.
- Died: January 2, 1938 (aged 62) Freeport, Illinois, U.S.
- Party: Republican

William Richard Johnson (May 15, 1875 – January 2, 1938) was a U.S. representative from Illinois.

Born in Rock Island, Illinois, Johnson moved with his parents to Freeport, Illinois, in 1879. He attended the public schools and the College of Commerce at Freeport. He served from 1890 to 1894 as an apprentice and from 1894 to 1899 as a locomotive blacksmith in the Illinois Central Railroad shops at Freeport. He served as member of the United States Capitol Police 1901-1919. He was appointed superintendent of the folding room of the House of Representatives on June 18, 1919, and served until March 3, 1925, when he resigned.

Johnson was elected as a Republican to the Sixty-ninth and to the three succeeding Congresses (March 4, 1925 – March 3, 1933). He was an unsuccessful candidate for renomination in 1932. He returned to Freeport, Illinois, where he died of congestive heart failure on January 2, 1938. He was interred in Oakland Cemetery.

U.S. House of Representatives
Preceded by John C. McKenzie	Member of the U.S. House of Representatives from Illinois's 13th congressional district 1925-1933	Succeeded by Leo E. Allen
