= Elizabeth station (Illinois) =

- Chicago Great Western Railroad Depot
- U.S. National Register of Historic Places
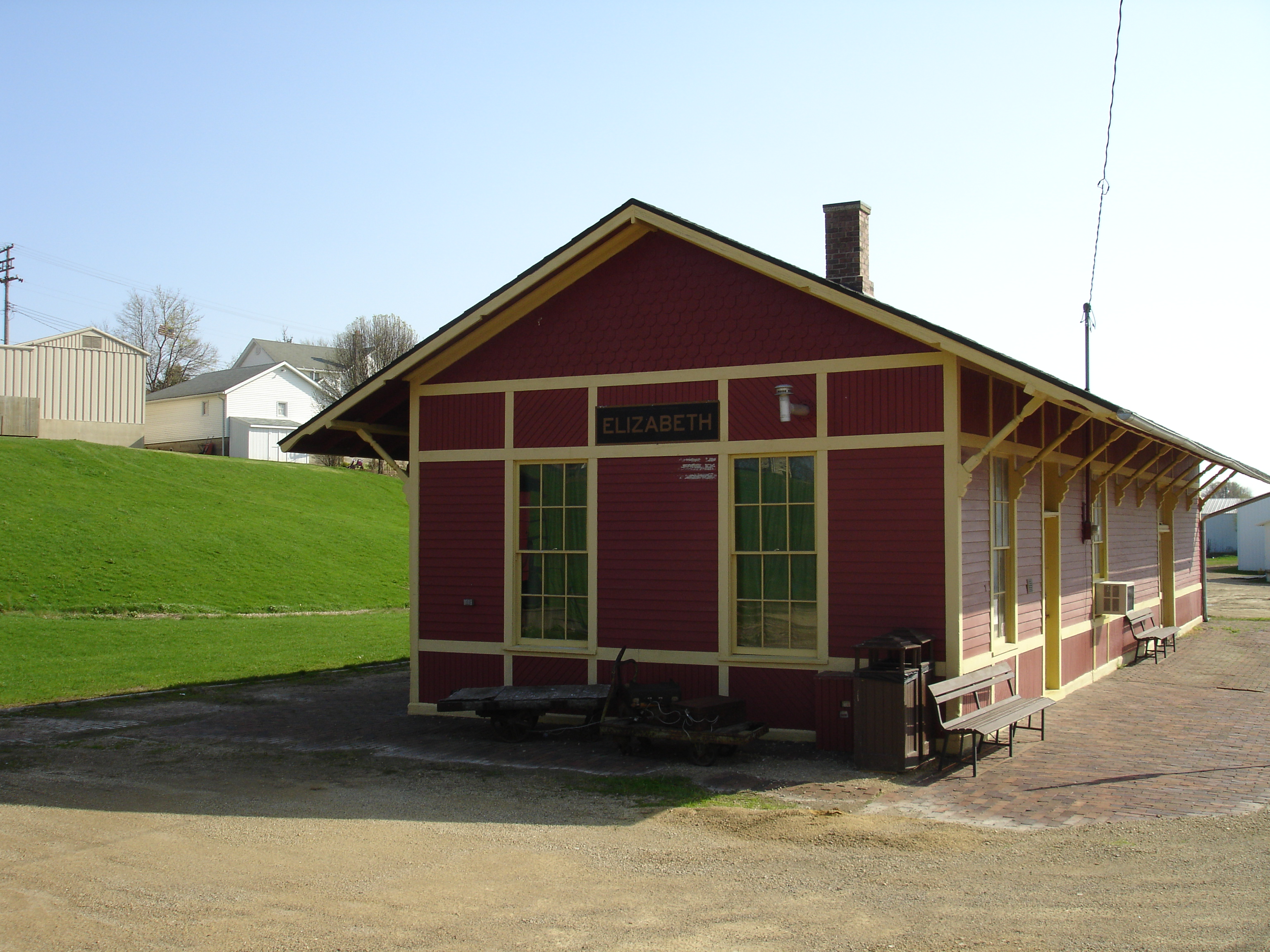

- Location within Illinois
- Location: Elizabeth, Jo Daviess County, Illinois, United States
- Coordinates: 42.3170°N 90.2224°W
- Area: less than one acre
- Built: 1877–78
- Architectural style: Stick style
- NRHP reference No.: 96000098
- Added to NRHP: February 16, 1996

The Chicago Great Western Railroad Depot is a historic railway station in the village of Elizabeth, Illinois, U.S. It was built in 1877–78 and like many rural stations along the Chicago Great Western Railroad it was cast in Stick style. The building was listed on the U.S. National Register of Historic Places in 1996.

== History ==
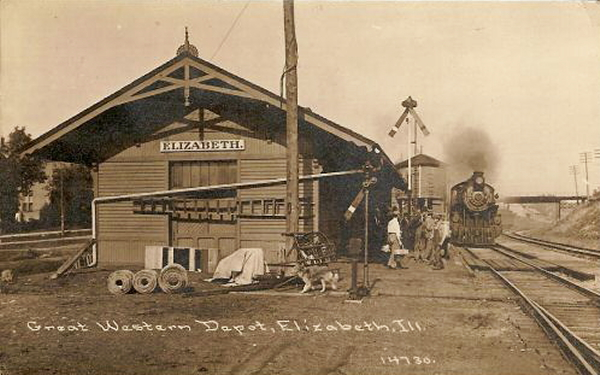
Elizabeth station seen around 1900.

The Elizabeth, Illinois Chicago Great Western Railroad Depot was built in 1877–78 by the Minnesota Northwestern Railway Company. In January 1892, A.B. Stickney's Chicago Great Western Railroad company bought the Minnesota Northwestern company.

== Architecture ==
The design of the depot in Elizabeth is similar to the design of many of the rural stations built during the 1880s and 1890s along the Chicago Great Western Railroad. Many of these stations, including the Elizabeth depot, were small rectangular, side-gabled buildings built in Stick style. Through the years, some of the depot's original architectural details were lost. Located in a mixed commercial district, the area that was once the station's stockyard is now a lumber company, but the "Commercial Hotel", an 1889 hotel that served railroad patrons, across the street still stands.

== Museum ==
Today the restored depot building is operated by the Elizabeth Historical Society as the Chicago Great Western Railway Depot Museum. Exhibits include a film, railroad artifacts, and working N-scale, HO-scale, and G-scale model railroad layouts. The museum is open seasonally on weekends.

== Historic significance ==
The arrival of the depot in Elizabeth coincided with a record growth spurt between 1880 and 1900. The population of Elizabeth rose from 507 to 659 during those two decades and by the 1910s unofficial numbers estimated the population at close to 1,000. The station and the railroad industry in Elizabeth heralded a new era in the village. On February 16, 1996, the Chicago Great Western Railroad Station in Elizabeth, Illinois was added to the U.S. National Register of Historic Places.

Preceding station	Chicago Great Western Railway	Following station
Hanover toward Omaha	Omaha – Chicago	Woodbine toward Chicago
