= Elizabeth, Illinois =

Elizabeth
- Village
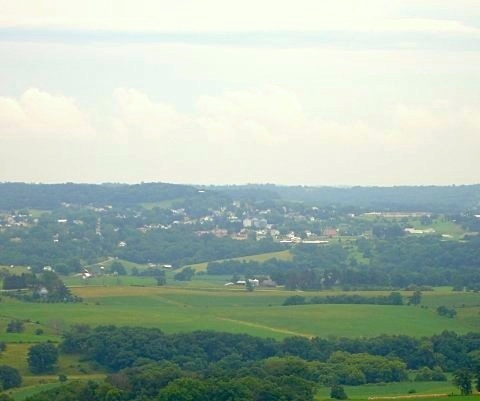
- Elizabeth, Illinois, as seen from the observation tower west of the village

- Logo
- Etymology: Elizabeth Armstrong, an early settler
- Nickname: The Heart of Jo Daviess County
- Location of Elizabeth in Jo Daviess County, Illinois
- Coordinates: 42°19′01″N 90°14′10″W
- Country: United States
- State: Illinois
- County: Jo Daviess
- Township: Elizabeth

Government
  - Body: Village Board

Area
  - Total: 0.92 sq mi (2.38 km^{2})
  - Land: 0.92 sq mi (2.38 km^{2})
  - Water: 0 sq mi (0.00 km^{2})
- Elevation: 817 ft (249 m)

Population (2020)
  - Total: 694
  - Density: 754.4/sq mi (291.26/km^{2})
- Time zone: UTC-6 (CST)
  - Summer (DST): UTC-5 (CDT)
- ZIP code: 61028
- Area code: 815 779
- FIPS code: 17-23165
- GNIS feature ID: 2398800
- Website: www.villageofelizabethil.com

Elizabeth is a village in Jo Daviess County, Illinois, United States. The population was 694 at the 2020 census.

== History ==
Prior to European contact, the area where the village stands today was inhabited by the Sauk and Meskwaki peoples. It is believed that white settlers had moved into the area starting in the early 1800s due to the prominence of lead in the earth. These mines that were built in Jo Daviess County are considered to be what triggered the 1832 Black Hawk War and the devastating Bad Axe Massacre. The Apple River Fort was built in response to this conflict and on June 24 a battle ensued. This is considered the last Native American offensive battle east of the Mississippi River.

During the battle, it is thought that a woman named Elizabeth Armstrong rallied the locals of the fort to continue the fight and assist the soldiers in any way they could. As a result of the bravery of her and the other women in the camp, the community was renamed from simply the Apple River Settlement to Elizabeth.

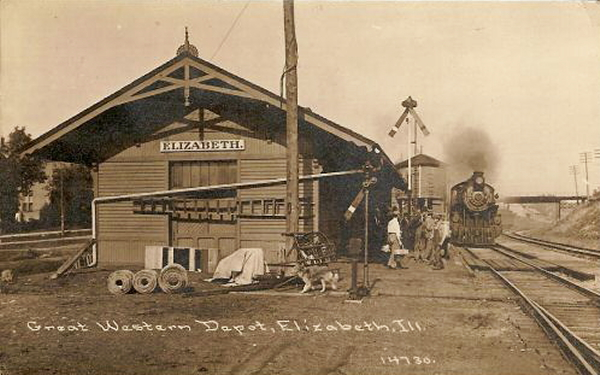
Elizabeth station seen c. 1900

Elizabeth was incorporated as a village in 1868.

In 1878 the Chicago Great Western Railroad was built through the area which caused an increase in population. Elizabeth station exists to this day and it was added to the National Register of Historic Places in 1996.

== Geography ==
According to the 2021 census gazetteer files, Elizabeth has a total area of 0.92 square miles (2.38 km^{2}), all land.

=== Climate ===
Climate data for Elizabeth, Illinois (1991–2020 normals, extremes 1984–present)
Month	Jan	Feb	Mar	Apr	May	Jun	Jul	Aug	Sep	Oct	Nov	Dec	Year
Record high °F (°C)	59 (15)	72 (22)	85 (29)	88 (31)	96 (36)	101 (38)	103 (39)	102 (39)	97 (36)	91 (33)	77 (25)	71 (22)	103 (39)
Mean maximum °F (°C)	48.7 (9.3)	53.7 (12.1)	69.4 (20.8)	78.4 (25.8)	86.5 (30.3)	91.4 (33.0)	92.6 (33.7)	91.0 (32.8)	88.8 (31.6)	82.2 (27.9)	66.5 (19.2)	52.9 (11.6)	94.3 (34.6)
Mean daily maximum °F (°C)	28.0 (−2.2)	32.8 (0.4)	45.5 (7.5)	58.8 (14.9)	70.2 (21.2)	79.8 (26.6)	83.3 (28.5)	81.4 (27.4)	74.6 (23.7)	62.1 (16.7)	46.6 (8.1)	33.6 (0.9)	58.1 (14.5)
Daily mean °F (°C)	19.2 (−7.1)	23.5 (−4.7)	35.5 (1.9)	47.3 (8.5)	58.6 (14.8)	68.8 (20.4)	72.2 (22.3)	70.1 (21.2)	62.3 (16.8)	50.5 (10.3)	37.2 (2.9)	25.3 (−3.7)	47.5 (8.6)
Mean daily minimum °F (°C)	10.4 (−12.0)	14.3 (−9.8)	25.4 (−3.7)	35.8 (2.1)	47.1 (8.4)	57.7 (14.3)	61.2 (16.2)	58.8 (14.9)	50.0 (10.0)	38.9 (3.8)	27.8 (−2.3)	16.9 (−8.4)	37.0 (2.8)
Mean minimum °F (°C)	−14.6 (−25.9)	−8.3 (−22.4)	6.0 (−14.4)	21.1 (−6.1)	31.5 (−0.3)	43.4 (6.3)	50.6 (10.3)	48.0 (8.9)	35.3 (1.8)	22.8 (−5.1)	11.3 (−11.5)	−5.1 (−20.6)	−18.8 (−28.2)
Record low °F (°C)	−35 (−37)	−35 (−37)	−20 (−29)	9 (−13)	21 (−6)	33 (1)	39 (4)	37 (3)	19 (−7)	9 (−13)	−2 (−19)	−29 (−34)	−35 (−37)
Average precipitation inches (mm)	1.43 (36)	1.74 (44)	2.33 (59)	3.85 (98)	4.29 (109)	5.82 (148)	4.65 (118)	4.02 (102)	3.85 (98)	3.04 (77)	2.44 (62)	1.89 (48)	39.35 (999)
Average snowfall inches (cm)	8.4 (21)	8.1 (21)	3.5 (8.9)	1.1 (2.8)	0.0 (0.0)	0.0 (0.0)	0.0 (0.0)	0.0 (0.0)	0.0 (0.0)	0.3 (0.76)	1.9 (4.8)	6.9 (18)	30.2 (77.26)
Average precipitation days (≥ 0.01 in)	8.6	8.0	8.6	11.0	12.1	11.7	9.5	9.1	8.9	8.8	8.4	9.0	113.7
Average snowy days (≥ 0.1 in)	5.4	4.1	2.4	0.5	0.0	0.0	0.0	0.0	0.0	0.1	1.1	4.4	18.0
Source: NOAA

== Demographics ==
Historical population
Census	Pop.	Note	%±
1880	507		—
1890	495		−2.4%
1900	659		33.1%
1910	703		6.7%
1920	687		−2.3%
1930	651		−5.2%
1940	694		6.6%
1950	723		4.2%
1960	729		0.8%
1970	707		−3.0%
1980	772		9.2%
1990	641		−17.0%
2000	682		6.4%
2010	761		11.6%
2020	694		−8.8%
U.S. Decennial Census

As of the 2020 census there were 694 people, 510 households, and 215 families residing in the village. The population density was 754.35 inhabitants per square mile (291.26/km^{2}). There were 391 housing units at an average density of 425.00 per square mile (164.09/km^{2}). The racial makeup of the village was 95.10% White, 0.43% African American, 0.29% Native American, 0.14% Asian, 0.00% Pacific Islander, 0.58% from other races, and 3.46% from two or more races. Hispanic or Latino of any race were 3.46% of the population.

There were 510 households, out of which 19.6% had children under the age of 18 living with them, 28.43% were married couples living together, 7.45% had a female householder with no husband present, and 57.84% were non-families. 50.59% of all households were made up of individuals, and 30.20% had someone living alone who was 65 years of age or older. The average household size was 2.41 and the average family size was 1.71.

The village's age distribution consisted of 14.0% under the age of 18, 9.3% from 18 to 24, 28.3% from 25 to 44, 16.7% from 45 to 64, and 31.7% who were 65 years of age or older. The median age was 42.8 years. For every 100 females, there were 84.1 males. For every 100 females age 18 and over, there were 79.9 males.

The median income for a household in the village was $36,250, and the median income for a family was $54,028. Males had a median income of $35,476 versus $24,625 for females. The per capita income for the village was $30,137. About 8.8% of families and 15.7% of the population were below the poverty line, including 18.3% of those under age 18 and 20.0% of those age 65 or over.

== Media ==
Although a settlement of modest size, Elizabeth incorporated in 1868, has a long history of printed media. It was first served by the Elizabeth News, starting at the latest in 1889. In 1913 or 1914 the paper changed its name to the Elizabeth Weekly News. The Elizabeth Weekly continued its publication until 1979. A second newspaper, the Elizabeth Times, was published in the village from 1937 through 1955.

== Education ==
River Ridge Community Unit School District 210 operates area public schools, including River Ridge High School.

== Notable residents ==
- Leo E. Allen, 14-term U.S. Congressman, was born in Elizabeth. (1898−1973)
- Elizabeth Armstrong, namesake of the village (1798−1857)
- Andrew Bird, notable multi-instrumentalist has a farm home just outside this village. (1973− )
- John C. McKenzie, former U.S. Congressman lived most of his life in Elizabeth (1860−1941)

== See also ==
- Apple River Fort
- Battle of Apple River Fort
- Chicago Great Western Railroad Depot
- Elizabeth Armstrong
