= Berlin Township, Bureau County, Illinois =

Township in Illinois, United States

Berlin Township
- Township
- Location in Bureau County

- Bureau County's location in Illinois
- Coordinates: 41°26′47″N 89°20′09″W
- Country: United States
- State: Illinois
- County: Bureau
- Established: November 6, 1849

Area
  - Total: 36.56 sq mi (94.7 km^{2})
  - Land: 36.56 sq mi (94.7 km^{2})
  - Water: 0 sq mi (0 km^{2}) 0%
- Elevation: 735 ft (224 m)

Population (2020)
  - Total: 659
  - Density: 18.0/sq mi (6.96/km^{2})
- Time zone: UTC-6 (CST)
  - Summer (DST): UTC-5 (CDT)
- ZIP codes: 61312, 61323, 61330, 61337, 61356
- FIPS code: 17-011-05430

Berlin Township is one of twenty-five townships in Bureau County, Illinois, United States. As of the 2020 census, its population was 659 and it contained 297 housing units.

== Geography ==
According to the 2010 census, the township has a total area of 36.56 square miles (94.7 km^{2}), all land.

=== Cities ===
- Dover (east quarter)
- Malden

=== Unincorporated towns ===
- Zearing

=== Cemeteries ===
The township contains Malden Cemetery.

=== Major highways ===
- US Route 34

Historical population
Census	Pop.	Note	%±
2010	746		—
2020	659		−11.7%
US Decennial Census

== Demographics ==
As of the 2020 census there were 659 people, 289 households, and 200 families residing in the township. The population density was 18.03 inhabitants per square mile (6.96/km^{2}). There were 297 housing units at an average density of 8.12 per square mile (3.14/km^{2}). The racial makeup of the township was 94.23% White, 1.06% African American, 0.30% Native American, 0.00% Asian, 0.00% Pacific Islander, 1.97% from other races, and 2.43% from two or more races. Hispanic or Latino of any race were 5.01% of the population.

There were 289 households, out of which 33.90% had children under the age of 18 living with them, 53.29% were married couples living together, 10.38% had a female householder with no spouse present, and 30.80% were non-families. 24.90% of all households were made up of individuals, and 12.80% had someone living alone who was 65 years of age or older. The average household size was 2.51 and the average family size was 2.89.

The township's age distribution consisted of 24.4% under the age of 18, 6.7% from 18 to 24, 26.8% from 25 to 44, 25% from 45 to 64, and 16.9% who were 65 years of age or older. The median age was 37.2 years. For every 100 females, there were 96.2 males. For every 100 females age 18 and over, there were 114.5 males.

The median income for a household in the township was $66,806, and the median income for a family was $76,964. Males had a median income of $51,250 versus $18,958 for females. The per capita income for the township was $28,651. About 15.5% of families and 18.0% of the population were below the poverty line, including 37.3% of those under age 18 and 6.5% of those age 65 or over.

== School districts ==
- Malden Community School District
- La Moille Community Unit School District 303

== Political districts ==
- Illinois's 11th congressional district
- State House District 76
- State Senate District 38
