= Elizabeth Armstrong (settler) =

American settler (1798–1857)

Elizabeth Armstrong (née Boyd; October 21, 1798 – 13 November 1857) was an American settler who found temporary shelter at Apple River Fort with her husband, John, and two children during the 1832 Black Hawk War. She was praised for her bravery during the Battle of Apple River Fort.

== Early life ==
Elizabeth Armstrong was born Elizabeth Boyd on October 21, 1798, in Bourbon County, Kentucky. Shortly after her birth, her family immigrated to Spanish Missouri. Her father became a Spanish citizen and was awarded a land grant in present-day Lincoln County, Missouri. In 1817, Elizabeth, 19, was married to John Armstrong. The couple had two children, David and Catherine. Around 1827, the Armstrong family moved to Jo Daviess County, Illinois and settled south of the Falls of Apple River in present-day Hanover Township. In late May, during the 1832 Black Hawk War, the Armstrong family sought protection at the new Apple River Fort

== Black Hawk War ==
On the afternoon of June 24, 1832 the Black Hawk War came to Apple River Fort. There were 28–30 armed militia and civilians inside Apple River Fort at the time of the attack. Another 40 women, children, and infants sought protection at the stockade. Captain Clack Stone command the militia company at the Fort, some of whom were not present for the battle.

As Black Hawk's 200-strong war-party closed in on the Fort, the locals ran for shelter inside the fort while the 28–30 men and boys took up positions at the portholes that had been cut between the fort's pickets. A vicious firefight erupted, involving about 150 of Black Hawk's war-party. The fighting raged for about an hour with heavy gunfire from both sides. At the battle's onset most of the settlement's women had huddled in small panic-stricken groups, but Armstrong and other married women rallied the young women, boys, and girls to provide support to the soldiers. She assigned them to such tasks as molding new rifleballs, rolling gunpowder cartridges, and reloading the weapons, while the soldiers tried to keep up a steady stream of gunfire.

== Legacy ==
Elizabeth Armstrong was praised as a heroine for her actions during the battle, displaying the kind of courage under fire the Illinois militia had so badly lacked during the first month of the Black Hawk War. Her actions, in part, helped give Black Hawk the impression that Apple River Fort was too heavily defended. It was some time before the settlers learned that Black Hawk, himself had led the attack. In the past, there was some confusion regarding the name of the woman who assumed a lead organizational role at Apple River Fort; a 1900 collection from the Wisconsin Historical Society described her as "Mrs. Graham." The same source stated that Armstrong was "cursing & swearing like a pirate" throughout the battle; so angry that even Black Hawk's band purported to hear her. The same collection described such action as "profane" and "a great drawback upon her credit." A newspaper report in Galena, Illinois described Armstrong's actions at the Battle of Apple River Fort. "Elizabeth Armstrong took charge of the women's activities and set a coolheaded, courageous example." Since the 1930s it was mistakenly suggested that Armstrong was the namesake for the village of Elizabeth, IL. That honor went to another "Elizabeth" at Apple River Fort: Elizabeth Winters.

Armstrong died in 1857 in Hanover, Illinois. She and her husband are buried in Lost Mound Cemetery in Hanover Township.
