= Zearing, Illinois =

- Unincorporated community
- Location within Illinois Location within the United States
- Coordinates: 41°26′44″N 89°19′02″W
- Country: United States
- State: Illinois
- County: Bureau
- Elevation: 738 ft (225 m)
- Time zone: UTC-6 (Central (CST))
  - Summer (DST): UTC-5 (CDT)
- Zip: 61381
- Area codes: 815 & 779
- GNIS feature ID: 421610

Zearing is an unincorporated community in Bureau County, Illinois, United States. Zearing is located along a railroad line southwest of Arlington.

Zearing was once a division point on the Chicago, Burlington and Quincy Railroad, where the Aurora and Galesburg divisions met. A small rail yard remains at Zearing, now operated by BNSF Railway. A second Burlington line, now abandoned, crossed the existing line at Zearing. Though always a small town, the transient population at the rail division point made Zearing a dangerous place. In 1920, a disputed Craps game led to a fatal shooting with a massive manhunt, and two years later, an unruly rail workers' strike led to thirteen special agents being dispatched to the tiny community. Several fatal injuries occurred at the rail junction in its busiest era.

Joseph R. Peterson (1904–1967), Illinois lawyer and state legislator, was born on a farm near Zearing.
