= Blue Mounds Fort =

- Fort Blue Mounds
- U.S. National Register of Historic Places
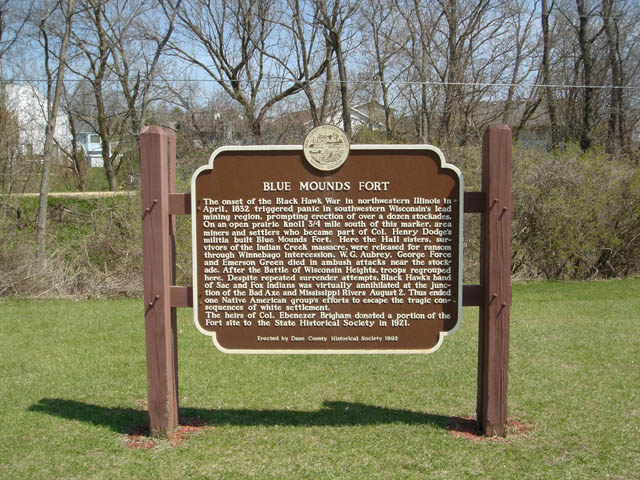
- Sign across the river from the original site.
- Location: Dane County, Wisconsin, United States
- Nearest city: Blue Mounds
- Coordinates: 43°01′03″N 89°49′56″W
- Built: May 10, 1832
- NRHP reference No.: 01001044
- Added to NRHP: September 24, 2001

Fort Blue Mounds, also known as Blue Mounds Fort, was located in Blue Mounds, Dane County, Wisconsin, United States.

== History ==
The settlement of Blue Mounds was founded in 1828 by Ebenezer Brigham on the south slope of the eastern mound of the Blue Mounds. In 1832, when word arrived that Chief Black Hawk and his 1200 Sauk followers had crossed the Mississippi River, it was decided to build a fort to protect the settlers.

On May 10, 1832, the construction of Fort Blue Mounds began with the help of the residents of Blue Mounds, led by the newly promoted Colonel Ebenezer Brigham. The fort was built a mile south of Eastern Mound on the highest part of the open prairie, allowing for a commanding view of the open country for miles. Those who defended the fort were able to see to the east, south, and west, with the mound bounding the northern side of the fort.

Word quickly arrived at the settlement of an engagement between Black Hawk's group and the Illinois militia on May 14, 1832. In what was to be called the Battle of Stillman's Run, the Illinois militia were defeated by the Indians. This, along with the closeness of the Ho-Chunk tribe, brought fear to the settlers, and they worked quickly to complete the fort in about two weeks.

From May 20 to September 20, 1832, the settlers and miners joined General Henry Dodge's Michigan Territory Militia during the Black Hawk War.

James Aubrey was the first commander at the fort, but after he was killed by the Indians on June 6, his first lieutenant, Edward Beouchard, took command. He didn't command long before Captain John Sherman succeeded him.

== Archaeology ==
The site of the original fort was owned by Colonel Brigham's descendants until it was donated to the Wisconsin Historical Society, who dedicated it as a state historical site on September 5, 1921.

Through excavation, it was found that the layout of the fort was very similar to one at Apple River in Illinois. The fort was surrounded by a picket fence about 150 feet (46 m) in length on each side. Its wall was made from oak trees that were about 16 or 17 feet (5.2 m) in height, with 3 feet (0.91 m) of trunk planted in the ground. At two of the corners of the fort were 20-foot (6.1 m) square blockhouses. Inside the wall was a log building in the center that was 30 by 20 feet (6.1 m) that was used as a store-house and barracks.

== Today ==
On May 22, 2010, the Blue Mounds Fort marker was rededicated following a three-year fundraising effort by the Blue Mounds Area Historical Society. The marker, which was cleaned up and re-mounted on a chert boulder donated by Blue Mound State Park, sits on the site of the Fort, although it is not currently accessible by the public.

== See also ==
- Attacks at Fort Blue Mounds
- Battle of Apple River Fort
