= Dover Township, Bureau County, Illinois =

Dover Township
- Township
- Location in Bureau County

- Bureau County's location in Illinois
- Coordinates: 41°26′59″N 89°27′18″W
- Country: United States
- State: Illinois
- County: Bureau
- Established: November 6, 1849

Area
  - Total: 36.85 sq mi (95.4 km^{2})
  - Land: 36.85 sq mi (95.4 km^{2})
  - Water: 0 sq mi (0 km^{2}) 0%
- Elevation: 705 ft (215 m)

Population (2020)
  - Total: 490
  - Density: 13/sq mi (5.1/km^{2})
- Time zone: UTC-6 (CST)
  - Summer (DST): UTC-5 (CDT)
- ZIP codes: 61323, 61349, 61356, 61376
- FIPS code: 17-011-20539

Dover Township is one of twenty-five townships in Bureau County, Illinois, USA. As of the 2020 census, its population was 490 and it contained 252 housing units.

== Geography ==
According to the 2010 census, the township has a total area of 36.85 square miles (95.4 km^{2}), all land.

=== Cities ===
- Dover (west three-quarters)
- Princeton (north edge)

=== Unincorporated towns ===
- Limerick

=== Cemeteries ===
The township contains six cemeteries:

- Dover
- Heatons Point
- Limerick
- Mason
- Pioneer
- Prairie Repose

=== Major highways ===
- US Route 34
- Illinois Route 26

=== Landmarks ===
- City Co Park

== Demographics ==
As of the 2020 census there were 490 people, 212 households, and 136 families residing in the township. The population density was 13.34 inhabitants per square mile (5.15/km^{2}). There were 252 housing units at an average density of 6.86 per square mile (2.65/km^{2}). The racial makeup of the township was 93.67% White, 0.00% African American, 0.82% Native American, 0.20% Asian, 0.00% Pacific Islander, 1.22% from other races, and 4.08% from two or more races. Hispanic or Latino people of any race were 4.29% of the population.

There were 212 households, out of which 28.80% had children under the age of 18 living with them, 63.68% were married couples living together, none had a female householder with no spouse present, and 35.85% were non-families. 34.90% of all households were made up of individuals, and 13.20% had someone living alone who was 65 years of age or older. The average household size was 2.20 and the average family size was 2.84.

The township's age distribution consisted of 23.8% under the age of 18, 1.3% from 18 to 24, 16.1% from 25 to 44, 38.7% from 45 to 64, and 20.2% who were 65 years of age or older. The median age was 48.2 years. For every 100 females, there were 86.4 males. For every 100 females age 18 and over, there were 112.6 males.

The median income for a household in the township was $82,727, and the median income for a family was $89,348. Males had a median income of $73,839 versus $45,875 for females. The per capita income for the township was $35,906. About 4.4% of families and 10.9% of the population were below the poverty line, including 5.4% of those under age 18 and 31.9% of those age 65 or over.

Historical population
Census	Pop.	Note	%±
2010	550		—
2020	490		−10.9%
US Decennial Census

== Political districts ==
- Illinois's 11th congressional district
- State House District 74
- State Senate District 37
