= Dover, Illinois =

- Village
- Location of Dover in Bureau County, Illinois.
- Coordinates: 41°26′03″N 89°23′45″W
- Country: United States
- State: Illinois
- County: Bureau
- Townships: Dover, Berlin

Area
  - Total: 0.29 sq mi (0.75 km^{2})
  - Land: 0.28 sq mi (0.73 km^{2})
  - Water: 0.00 sq mi (0 km^{2})
- Elevation: 745 ft (227 m)

Population (2020)
  - Total: 135
  - Density: 480/sq mi (190/km^{2})
- Time zone: UTC-6 (CST)
  - Summer (DST): UTC-5 (CDT)
- ZIP code: 61323
- Area codes: 815 & 779
- FIPS code: 17-20526
- GNIS ID: 2398743

Dover is a village in Bureau County, Illinois, United States. The population was 135 at the 2020 census. It is part of the Ottawa Micropolitan Statistical Area.

== History ==
Dover was platted in 1833, and named after Dover, New Hampshire, the native home of a first settler. A post office has been in operation at Dover since 1839. Joseph R. Peterson (1904–1967), Illinois lawyer and state legislator; served as mayor of Dover in 1929 and 1930

== Geography ==
According to the 2021 census gazetteer files, Dover has a total area of 0.28 square miles (0.73 km^{2}), all land.

== Demographics ==
Historical population
Census	Pop.	Note	%±
1850	103		—
1860	362		251.5%
1870	304		−16.0%
1880	239		−21.4%
1890	220		−7.9%
1900	247		12.3%
1910	181		−26.7%
1920	165		−8.8%
1930	155		−6.1%
1940	155		0.0%
1950	191		23.2%
1960	171		−10.5%
1970	176		2.9%
1980	213		21.0%
1990	163		−23.5%
2000	172		5.5%
2010	168		−2.3%
2020	135		−19.6%
U.S. Decennial Census

As of the 2020 census there were 135 people, 62 households, and 46 families residing in the village. The population density was 482.14 inhabitants per square mile (186.16/km^{2}). There were 69 housing units at an average density of 246.43 per square mile (95.15/km^{2}). The racial makeup of the village was 94.81% White, 0.74% Native American, 2.22% from other races, and 2.22% from two or more races. Hispanic or Latino of any race were 5.19% of the population.

There were 62 households, out of which 27.4% had children under the age of 18 living with them, 72.58% were married couples living together, none had a female householder with no husband present, and 25.81% were non-families. 22.58% of all households were made up of individuals, and 12.90% had someone living alone who was 65 years of age or older. The average household size was 2.63 and the average family size was 2.27.

The village's age distribution consisted of 20.6% under the age of 18, 4.3% from 18 to 24, 14.9% from 25 to 44, 29.1% from 45 to 64, and 31.2% who were 65 years of age or older. The median age was 55.2 years. For every 100 females, there were 98.6 males. For every 100 females age 18 and over, there were 111.3 males.

The median income for a household in the village was $36,618. Males had a median income of $45,417 versus $39,167 for females. The per capita income for the village was $29,457. About 13.0% of families and 17.0% of the population were below the poverty line, including 20.7% of those under age 18 and 18.2% of those age 65 or over.

== Education ==
It is in the Princeton Elementary School District 115 and the Princeton High School District 500.
