= Indian Creek massacre =

1832 killing of US settlers in the Black Hawk War

Indian Creek Massacre
- Part of the Black Hawk War
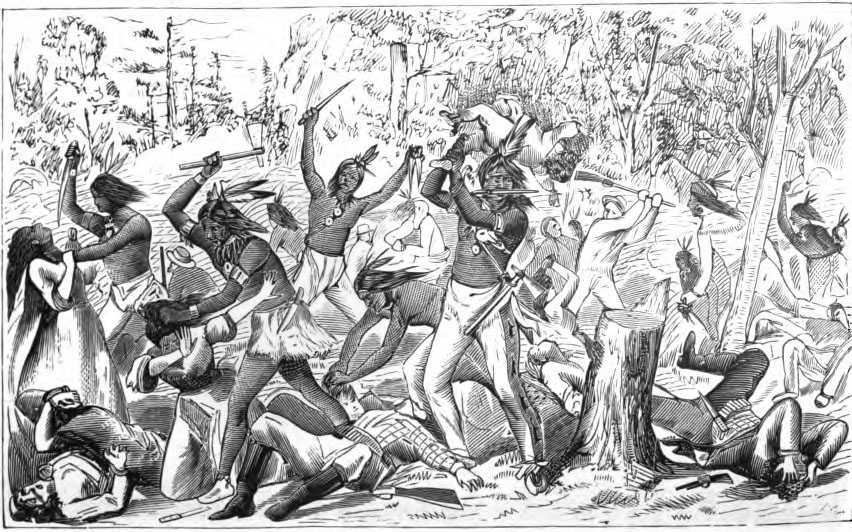
- An 1878 depiction of the massacre
Date	May 21, 1832
Location	Near present-day Earlville, Illinois 41°32′18″N 88°50′52″W

Belligerents
Illinois settlers	Potawatomi raiding party and three Sauks

Strength
23 civilians	40–80 warriors

Casualties and losses
15 killed, 2 captured	

The Indian Creek Massacre occurred on May 21, 1832 with the attack by a party of Native Americans on a group of United States settlers in LaSalle County, Illinois following a dispute about a settler-constructed dam that prevented fish from reaching a nearby Potawatomi village. The incident coincided with the Black Hawk War, but it was not a direct action of the Sauk leader Black Hawk and conflict with the United States. The removal of the dam was asked, was rejected by the settlers and between 40 and 80 Potawatomis and three Sauks attacked and killed fifteen settlers, including women and children. Two young women kidnapped by the Indians were ransomed and released unharmed about two weeks later.

The tension of the massacre and the war prompted settlers to seek protection at frontier forts under the control of the militia. Three men were arrested for the killings, but the charges were dropped when their alleged role in the massacre could not be verified by the witnesses. Today, the site of the massacre is marked by memorials in Shabbona County Park in LaSalle County, about 14 miles (23 km) north of Ottawa, Illinois.

== Background ==
The Indian Creek massacre resulted from a dispute between U.S. settlers and a Potawatomi Native American village along the Indian Creek in LaSalle County, Illinois. In the spring of 1832, a blacksmith named William Davis dammed the creek to provide power for his sawmill. Meau-eus, the principal chief of the small Potawatomi village, protested to Davis that the dam prevented fish from reaching the village. Davis ignored the protests and assaulted a Potawatomi male who tried to dismantle the dam. The villagers wanted to retaliate, but Potawatomi chiefs Shabbona and Waubonsie advised a compromise that the villagers fish below the dam.

Meanwhile, in February 1832, a Sauk leader named Black Hawk wanted to resettle on land ceded to the United States by the disputed Treaty of St. Louis (1804). Black Hawk thought that the Potawatomi in Illinois would support the resettlement since they had grievances about the United States expansion into Native American territory.

Potawatomi leaders feared that the United States had become too powerful to be opposed by their force. Potawatomi chiefs urged their people to stay neutral in the coming conflict, but, as in other tribes, chiefs did not have the authority or power to compel compliance. Potawatomi leaders worried that the tribe as a whole would be punished if any Potawatomi supported Black Hawk. At a council outside Chicago on May 1, 1832, Potawatomi leaders including Billy Caldwell "passed a resolution declaring any Potawatomi who supported Black Hawk a traitor to his tribe". In mid May, Potawatomi leaders told Black Hawk that he did not have their support.

Black Hawk led a group of Sauks, Meskwakis, and Kickapoos known as the "British Band", to cross the Mississippi River from Iowa into the U.S. state of Illinois. Black Hawk's motives were ambiguous, but it is said that he was apparently hoping to avoid bloodshed.

== Outbreak of violence ==
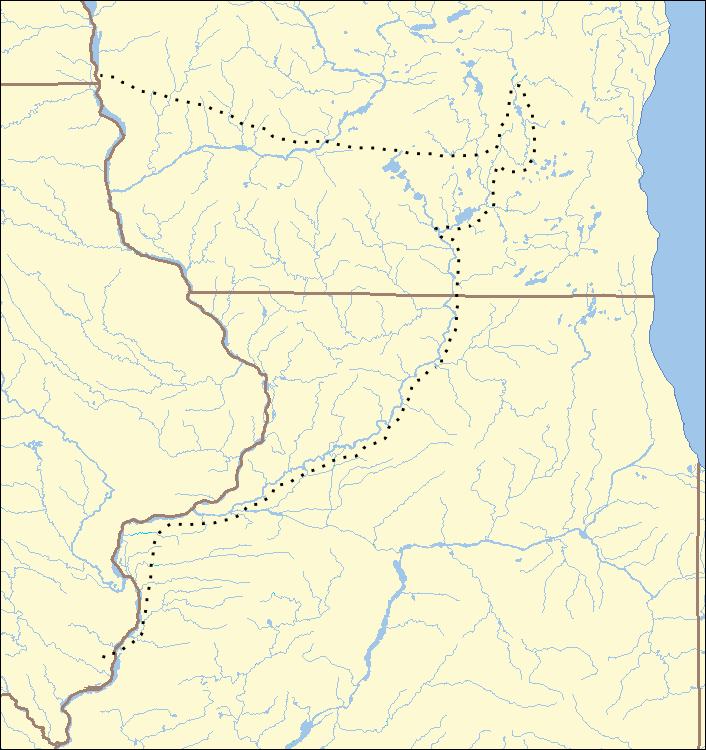
Map of Black Hawk War sites
Battle (with name) Fort / settlement Native village
Symbols are wikilinked to article

Hostilities in the Black Hawk War began on May 14, 1832, when Black Hawk's warriors soundly defeated Illinois militiamen at the Battle of Stillman's Run. Potawatomi Chief Shabbona worried that Black Hawk's success would encourage Native attacks on American settlements, and that Potawatomis would be held responsible. Soon after the battle, Shabbona, his son, and his nephew rode out to warn nearby American settlers, that they were in danger. Many people fled to Ottawa for safety, but William Davis, a settler from Kentucky, who had built the controversial dam, convinced some of his neighbors they were not in danger. Twenty-three people, including the Davis family, the Hall family, the Pettigrew family and several other men, remained at the Davis settlement.

== Attack and massacre ==
During the late afternoon of May 21, 1832, a party of about forty to eighty Potawatomis, with three Sauks from Black Hawk's band accompanying them, approached the Davis cabin, vaulted the fence and sprinted forward to attack. Several male settlers who were working in the fields and in the blacksmith's shop rushed to the house during the attack and were killed. Six of the young men escaped the slaughter by fleeing. Fifteen settlers were killed and scalped. One victim was scalped twice, from the hair on his head, to his beard. "The men and children were chopped to pieces," writes historian Kerry Trask, "and the dead women were hung up by their feet" and their bodies mutilated in ways too gruesome for contemporary observers to record in writing.

Most modern scholars do not identify the leader of this attack. According to historian Patrick Jung, the attack was led by the Potawatomi man who had been assaulted at the dam by Davis, but Jung did not identify this Potawatomi by name. Historians Kerry Trask and John Hall identified the man who had been assaulted as Keewassee, but they did not specifically indicate his participation in the attack, or any leader of the attack. Historian David Edmunds wrote that the attack was led by Toquame and Comee, two Potawatomi warriors. Jung said that Keewasse, Toquame, and Comee were three Sauk warriors who were merely accompanying the Potawatomis during the attack.

In 1872, amateur historian Nehemiah Matson wrote that the raid was led by a man named Mike Girty, who was believed to be the mixed race son of Simon Girty. Matson's validity as a source was questioned as early as 1903 in a book by Frank E. Stevens that indicated "The statement by Matson that one Mike Girty was connected with the Indian Creek massacre is incorrect." In 1960, Matson's work was questioned by scholars as a valid source, as he indiscriminately mixed fact and legend. Modern scholarly accounts of the Black Hawk War and the Indian Creek massacre make no mention of Mike Girty.

== Kidnapping ==
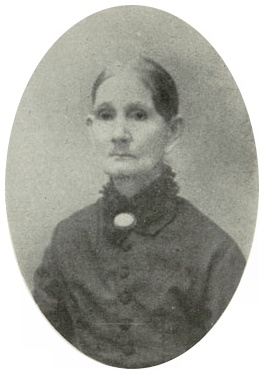
Sylvia Hall in an undated photograph published in 1903.

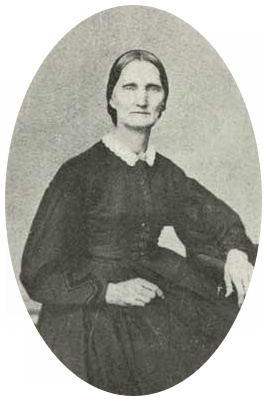
Rachel Hall, photographed in 1865 at about age 50.

Two young women from the settlement, Sylvia Hall (age 19) and Rachel Hall (age 17), were spared by the attackers and taken northwards. At one point, Sylvia fainted when she recognized that one of the warriors carried her mother's scalp. After a hard journey of about 80 miles, they arrived at Black Hawk's camp. The Hall sisters were held for eleven days. Most of the time was spent at Black Hawk's camp where they were treated well. In his memoirs dictated after the war, Black Hawk insisted that the three Sauks with the Potawatomis had saved the Hall sisters' lives. Black Hawk recounted:

They were brought to our encampment, and a messenger sent to the Winnebagoes, as they were friendly on both sides, to come and get them, and carry them to the whites. If these young men, belonging to my band, had not gone with the Pottowittomies [sic], the two young squaws would have shared the same fate as their friends.

A Ho-Chunk chief named White Crow negotiated their release. Like some other area Ho-Chunks, White Crow was trying to placate the Americans while clandestinely aiding the British Band. U.S. Indian agent Henry Gratiot paid a ransom for the girls of ten horses, wampum, and corn. The Hall sisters were released on June 1, 1832, at the Blue Mounds Fort.

== Aftermath ==
The Indian Creek massacre was the most significant publicized incident during the Black Hawk War. The killings triggered panic in the settler population who abandoned settlements and sought refuge in frontier forts, such as Fort Dearborn in Chicago.

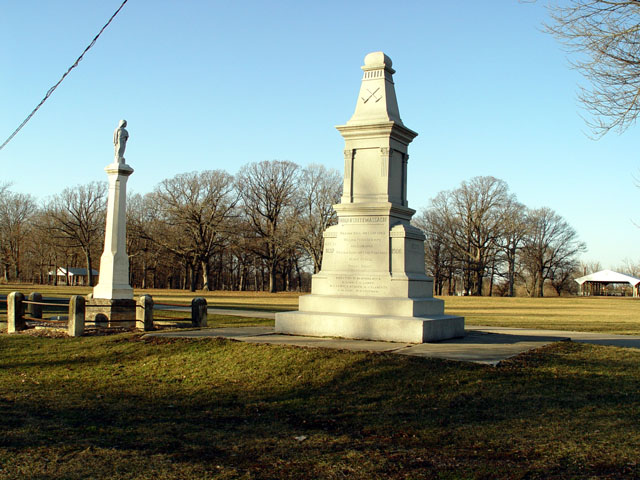
Monuments at the massacre site in Shabbona County Park, the older monument is on the left.

On May 21 or 22, the people in Chicago, including those who had fled there, dispatched a company of militia scouts to ascertain the situation in the area between Chicago and Ottawa, along the Chicago to Ottawa trail. The detachment, under the command of Captain Jesse B. Brown, came upon the mangled remains of the 15 victims at Indian Creek on May 22. They buried the dead and continued to Ottawa where they reported their grisly discovery. As a result, the Illinois militia used the event to draw more recruits from Illinois and Kentucky.

After the war, three men were charged with murders at Indian Creek and were issued warrants at the LaSalle County Courthouse for Keewasee, Toquame, and Comee. The charges were dropped when the Hall sisters could not identify the three men as part of the attacking party. In 1833, the Illinois General Assembly passed a law granting each of the Hall sisters 80 acres (320,000 m^{2}) of land along the Illinois and Michigan Canal as compensation and recognition for the hardships they had endured.

In 1877, William Munson, who had married Rachel Hall, erected a monument where the victims of the massacre were interred. The monument, located 14 miles (23 km) north of Ottawa, Illinois, cost $700. In 1902, the area was designated as Shabbona Park, and $5,000 was appropriated by the Illinois legislature for the erection and maintenance of a new monument. On August 29, 1906, a 16-foot granite monument was dedicated in a ceremony attended by four thousand people. Shabbona County Park, not to be confused with Shabbona Lake State Park in DeKalb County, is located in northern LaSalle County, west of Illinois Route 23.

== See also ==
- List of homicides in Illinois
