= British Band =

Multinational Native American militia

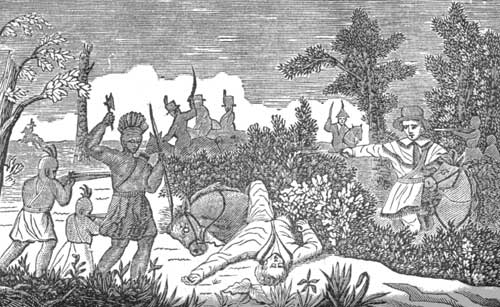
- This 1854 artist rendering depicts members of the British Band at Stillman's Run.
- Leader: Black Hawk
- Dates active: 1831–1832
- Groups: Sauk; Meskwaki; Kickapoo; Potawatomi; Ho-Chunk; Ottawa
- Active regions: Illinois; Michigan Territory
- Size: ~500 warriors ~1,000 civilians
- Wars: the Black Hawk War

The British Band was a mixed-nation group of Native Americans commanded by the Sauk leader Black Hawk, which fought against Illinois and Michigan Territory militias during the 1832 Black Hawk War. The band was composed of about 1,500 men, women, and children from the Sauk, Meskwaki, Kickapoo, Potawatomi, Ho-Chunk, and Ottawa nations; about 500 of that number were warriors. Black Hawk had an alliance with the British Empire dating back to the War of 1812, giving them their colloquial name. The band crossed the Mississippi River from Iowa into Illinois in an attempt to reclaim their homeland and in violation of several treaties. Subsequently, both the Illinois and Michigan Territory militia were called up and the Black Hawk War ensued.

The British Band was victorious at the Battle of Stillman's Run and the military engagements that followed were insignificant until the final two encounters: the Wisconsin Heights and the Bad Axe River. Band members who survived the war were either imprisoned or returned home. All the prisoners taken following the conflict were released by Winfield Scott at the end of August 1832, except Black Hawk who was taken east. In 1833 he dictated his autobiography, the first Native American autobiography published in the United States.

== Background ==
Sauk warrior Black Hawk, the leader of a band of Sauks near Rock Island at Saukenuk, was a chief voice of opposition to the ceding of Native American lands to American settlers and the U.S. government. Black Hawk supported the invalidity of the Treaty of St. Louis of both the Sauk and Meskwaki nations negotiated with the then Indiana Territory Governor William Henry Harrison. The treaty ceded territory, including Black Hawk's birthplace Saukenuk, to the United States. The Sauk traditionally had been a society that reached their decision-making via consensus. Their representatives exceeded the authorization of merely taking under consideration what terms the United States government might put forth, bring them back to reach a consensus and then return with their treaty terms. The lack of the tribe discussing the treaty prior to being made official made it invalid by Black Hawk and other members of the tribe. The representatives never had the tribal authorization to unilaterally cede its lands.

During the War of 1812 between the United Kingdom and the United States, Robert Dickson, an English fur trader, amassed a sizable force of Native Americans at Green Bay to assist the British in operations around the Great Lakes. Most of the warriors Dickson assembled were from the Potawatomi, Ho-Chunk, Kickapoo and Odawa tribes. Dickson conferred the rank of brevet brigadier general on Black Hawk. He was given command of all Native Americans gathered at Green Bay, including the 200 Sauk warriors under Black Hawk's control. Black Hawk was then presented with a silk flag, a medal, and a written certificate of good behavior and alliance with the British. The certificate would be found 20 years later, after the Battle of Bad Axe, carefully preserved along with a flag similar to the one Dickson gave to Black Hawk.

During the 1812 war, Black Hawk and his warriors fought in several engagements with Henry Procter on the borders of Lake Erie. He returned home to Saukenuk to find his rival Keokuk had become the tribe's war chief. After the war ended, Black Hawk signed a peace treaty in May 1816 that re-affirmed the treaty of 1804, a provision Black Hawk later protested ignorance of.

== Prelude to war ==
Despite opposition by Keokuk and the US authorities, Black Hawk's band returned to Saukenuk in 1830 following their winter hunt. A year later they returned again, and Illinois Governor John Reynolds proclaimed it an "invasion of the state."

Responding to Illinois Governor John Reynolds' call, General Edmund Pendleton Gaines brought his federal troops from St. Louis, Missouri to Saukenuk to insist on Black Hawk's immediate departure. Black Hawk left but soon returned to the west side of the Mississippi, threatened by Gaines' troops and an additional 1,400 militia called up by Reynolds on 25 June 1831. On 30 June, Black Hawk and the chiefs of the British Band were forced to sign a surrender agreement in which they promised to remain west of the Mississippi.

At the end of 1831, stories spread throughout the settlements of the Upper Mississippi River Valley that the British planned to aid Black Hawk in the event of a war with American settlers. According to U.S. Indian Agent Felix St. Vrain, a known ne'er-do-well named Billy Caldwell had delivered a message to the Sauk which reported the alleged British intentions. The New Galenian of Galena reported that Black Hawk's band would receive aid and ammunition from the British, and the tale was widely believed. The militia commander at Fort Armstrong, Major John Bliss, informed General Henry Atkinson of the rumor, and said a follower of Keokuk had reported to him that Black Hawk and Neapope were holding talks with bands of Potawatomi, Kickapoo, and Ho-Chunk. The talks mentioned the promises of the British, as well as word that the French Canadians intended to assist them. These events, combined with Black Hawk's 1812 alliance with the British, and occasional visits to Canada, attributed to his 1832 band becoming known by the moniker British Band. The term British Band was used frequently by American, Sauk, and Meskwaki observers alike and served to distinguish Black Hawk's group from the rest of the tribes.

== Black Hawk War ==
=== Forces ===
The British Band had three key leaders, Black Hawk, the Ho-Chunk prophet Wabokieshiek (White Cloud), and Neapope. There were seven civil chiefs besides Neapope and Wabokieshiek, and five war captains including Black Hawk. The other civil chiefs in the band were Pamisseau, Weesheet, Chakeepashipabo, Checokalako, Ioway, Pamaho, and Towaunonne; the four other war captains were: Menacou, Makatauaupuat, Pashetowat, and Kinnekonnesaut. The band was composed of about 500 warriors and 1,000 old men, women and children when they crossed the Mississippi on 5 April. The group included members of the Sauk, Meskwaki and Kickapoo Nations. They crossed the river near the mouth of the Iowa River and then followed the Rock River northeast. Along the way they passed the ruins of Saukenuk and headed for the village of Ho-Chunk prophet White Cloud.

As the war progressed factions of other tribes would join, or attempt to join Black Hawk, and others would carry out acts of violence for their own personal reasons amidst the chaos of the war. In one example a band of hostile Ho-Chunk intent on joining Black Hawk's Band attacked and killed the party of Felix St. Vrain after the outbreak of war in an event that became known as the St. Vrain massacre. This act, was, however, an exception as most Ho-Chunk sided with the United States during the Black Hawk War. The warriors that attacked St. Vrain's party acted with no authority or oversight from the Ho-Chunk nation. Sympathetic Potawatomi warriors also joined with Black Hawk's Band in the months between April and August.

=== Incursion ===
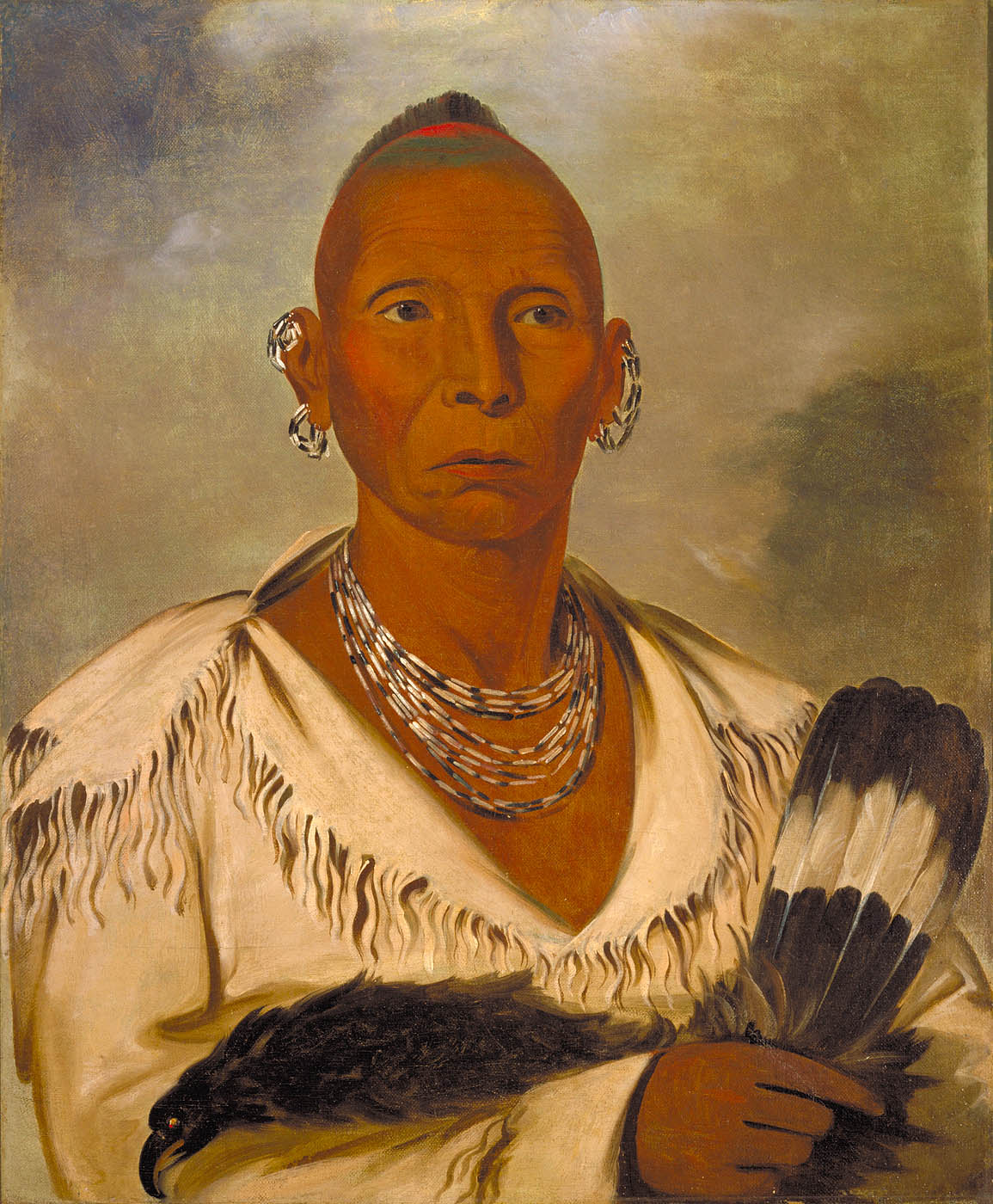
Black Hawk led the British Band across the Mississippi River on 5 April 1832.

When Black Hawk's Band crossed the Mississippi River from Iowa in April 1832 to return to their homeland in the Rock River Valley, it was under a British flag. Potawatomi Chief Shabbona stated it was the same flag that had been given on a visit to the British in Malden, Ontario, Canada. Observers at the time, from George Davenport, to St. Vrain, were certain that Black Hawk's intentions were to wage war against the United States. Historians generally believe that a more decisive action by General Atkinson, charged with prosecuting the war, in stopping Black Hawk's Band from moving up the Rock River may have prevented the war. Zachary Taylor made similar observations shortly after the war ended.

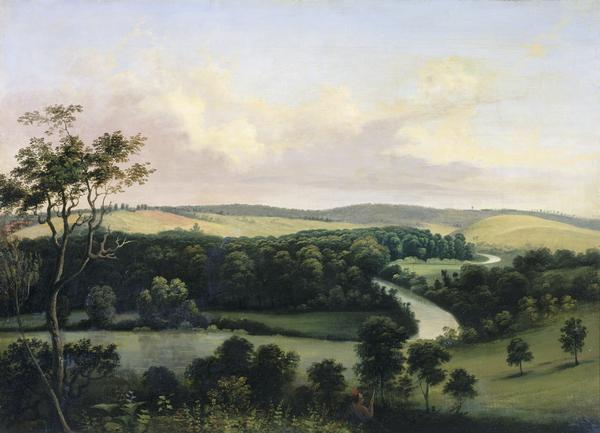
The British Band suffered a defeat at Horseshoe Bend, shown here in an 1857 painting.

In response to Black Hawk and his band's movements, Governor Reynolds issued a proclamation on 16 April, mustering five brigades of volunteers to form at Beardstown and to head north to force Black Hawk out of Illinois. Although one-third of all federal troops from the United States Army were eventually involved in the conflict, the 9,000 soldiers from the Illinois Militia provided the majority of U.S. combatants.

The first named confrontation of the Black Hawk War occurred on 14 May 1832 and resulted in an unexpected victory for Black Hawk's band of Sauk and Meskwaki warriors over the disorganized militia under the command of Isaiah Stillman. Soon after the Battle of Stillman's Run, at present-day Stillman Valley, the exaggerated claim that 2,000 "bloodthirsty warriors ... sweeping all northern Illinois with the bosom of destruction" sent shock waves of terror through the region. After this initial skirmish, Black Hawk led many of the civilians in his band to the Michigan Territory. On 19 May, the militia traveled up the Rock River trailing and searching for Black Hawk and his band. Several small skirmishes and massacres ensued over the next month in northern Illinois and present-day southern Wisconsin before the militia was able to regain public confidence in battles at Horseshoe Bend and Waddams Grove.

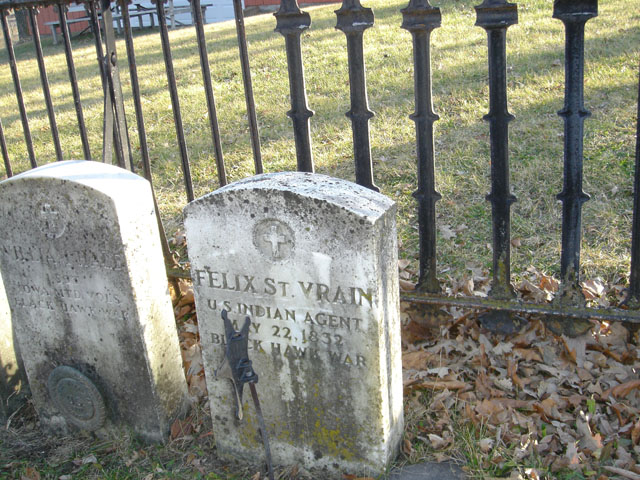
The grave of Felix St. Vrain, killed by Ho-Chunk warriors intent on joining the British Band in 1832.

=== Battles ===
Black Hawk himself led warriors in several battles, including Stillman's Run, the Battle of Apple River Fort on 24 June, the Second Battle of Kellogg's Grove on 25 June, and the final two battles at Wisconsin Heights and Bad Axe. Besides the major victory at Stillman's Run Black Hawk's Band was involved in several other battles and skirmishes during the Black Hawk War. Several of the small skirmishes and massacres that occurred following Stillman's Run were attributed to bands of Native Americans unaffiliated with Black Hawk's Band, though many were likely sympathetic or intent on joining him. The events at Spafford Farm were attributed to a band of Kickapoo loosely affiliated with the British Band.

After the massacre, General Henry Atkinson was informed that Henry Dodge was to take over General Alexander Posey's brigade at Fort Hamilton. While Dodge was on his way to visit the brigade, he heard a rifle shot from a group of Native Americans. Dodge quickly returned to his command post and gathered as many men as he could to pursue the enemy. With Dodge in quick pursuit, a group of approximately 11 Native warriors crisscrossed the Pecatonica River until, finding flight hopeless, they prepared to make a stand at the Battle of Horseshoe Bend.

The battle at Horseshoe Bend and a small, largely insignificant militarily, battle at Waddams Grove, helped restore public confidence in the Illinois Militia after the victory by the British Band at Stillman's Run. The British Band attacked the Apple River Fort, where a pitched battle was fought resulting in Black Hawk withdrawing his forces. Subsequent fighting at Kellogg's Grove has been called victory for both sides and the skirmishes resulted in 8 dead militia men and at least 15 dead British Band warriors.

=== Defeat ===
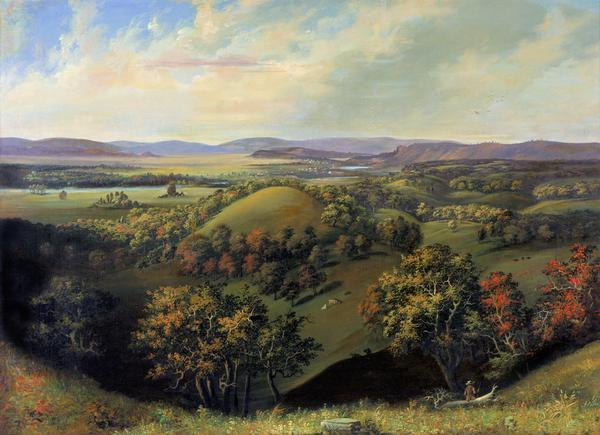
The Wisconsin Heights Battlefield in a 19th-century painting. It was the site of the British Band's penultimate battle.

On 21 July 1832, Illinois and Wisconsin militia men under the command of Generals Henry Dodge and James D. Henry caught up with Black Hawk's British Band near present-day Sauk City, Wisconsin. The clash became known as the Battle of Wisconsin Heights. Militarily, the battle was devastating for Black Hawk's band of warriors; including those who drowned during the melee, casualty estimates climbed as high as 70. Despite the relatively high casualties the battle did allow much of the Band, including many women and children, to escape across the Wisconsin River.

The militia regrouped at Fort Blue Mounds and picked up Black Hawk's trail again on 28 July near Spring Green, Wisconsin. When they finally caught up with the British Band, it would lead to the decisive clash of the war at Bad Axe. At the mouth of the Bad Axe River, hundreds of men, women and children would be killed by pursuing soldiers, their Indian allies, and a U.S. gunboat.

== Aftermath ==
The members of the British Band, and the Meskwaki, Kickapoo, Sauk and Ho-Chunk and Potawatomi that later joined them, suffered unknown numbers of dead during the war. While some died fighting, others were tracked down and killed by Sioux, Menominee, Ho-Chunk, and other native tribes. Still others died of starvation or drowned during the Band's long trek up the Rock River toward the mouth of the Bad Axe. The entire British Band was not wiped out at Bad Axe; some survivors drifted back home to their villages. This was relatively simple for the Potawatomi and Ho-Chunk of the band. Many Sauk and Meskwaki found return to their homes more difficult, and while some returned safely others were held in custody by the army. Prisoners, some taken at the Battle of Bad Axe, and others taken by U.S.-aligned Native American tribes in the following weeks, were taken to Fort Armstrong. About 120 prisoners – men, women, and children, waited until the end of August to be released by General Winfield Scott.

With most of the British Band dead and the rest captured or disbanded, the defeated Black Hawk was held in captivity at Jefferson Barracks with Neapope, White Cloud, and eight other leaders of the British Band. After 8 months, in April 1833 they were taken east, as ordered by then U.S. President Andrew Jackson. The men traveled by steamboat, carriage, and railroad, and met with large crowds wherever they went. Once in Washington, D.C., they met with Jackson and Secretary of War Lewis Cass, though their final destination was prison at Fortress Monroe in Virginia. They stayed only a few weeks at the prison, during which they mostly posed for multiple portraits by different artists. On 5 June 1833, the men were sent west by steamboat on a circuitous route that took them through many large cities. Again, the men were a spectacle everywhere they went, and met with huge crowds of people in cities such as New York, Baltimore and Philadelphia. Reaction in the west, however, was much different. For instance, in Detroit, a crowd burned and hanged effigies of the prisoners.

Near the end of his captivity in 1833, Black Hawk told his life story to a government interpreter, which was edited by a local reporter and became the first Native American autobiography published in the United States. The Autobiography of Ma-Ka-Tai-Me-She-Kia-Kiak, or Black Hawk, Embracing the Traditions of his Nation, Various Wars in Which He Has Been Engaged, and His Account of the Cause and General History of the Black Hawk War of 1832, His Surrender, and Travels Through the United States. Also Life, Death and Burial of the Old Chief, Together with a History of the Black Hawk War was published in 1882 in Oquawka, Illinois, as interpreted by Antoine LeClair and edited by J.B. Patterson.
