= Wieck =

Wieck can refer to:

== Places ==
- Wieck, Poland, in Gmina Czersk, Chojnice County, Pomeranian Voivodeship
- Wieck auf dem Darß, Vorpommern, Germany
- Wiekowice, Gmina Darłowo, Sławno County, West Pomeranian Voivodeship, Poland (formerly German Wieck)

== People ==
- Wieck family of musicians in Germany, including:
  - Friedrich Wieck (1785–1873)
  - Clara Wieck (1819–1896), pianist, composer, wife of Robert Schumann
  - Marie Wieck (1832–1916), pianist
- Agnes Burns Wieck (1892–1966), American labor organizer, journalist
- Brad Wieck (born 1991), American baseball player
- David Wieck, American philosopher, activist
- Hans-Georg Wieck (1928–2024) Former German diplomat and president of the German federal intelligence agency Bundesnachrichtendienst
- Michael Wieck (1928–2021), German violinist and author

== See also ==
- Wiek (disambiguation)
- Wick (disambiguation)
