= Geoffrey Ostergaard =

British political scientist (1926–1990)

- Born: Geoffrey Nielsen Ostergaard; 25 July 1926; Near Huntingdon, England
- Died: 22 March 1990 (aged 63); Birmingham, England
- Other name: Gaston Gerard (pseudonym)
- Known for: Work on the connections between Gandhism and anarchism, on the British co-operative movement, and on syndicalism and workers' control
- Spouse: Eva Dryden
- Children: Magnus

Academic background
- Education: Huntingdon Grammar School; Merton College, Oxford; Nuffield College, Oxford
- Alma mater: Nuffield College, Oxford
- Thesis: Public Ownership in Great Britain: A Study in the Development of Socialist Ideas (1953)
- Doctoral advisor: G. D. H. Cole

Academic work
- Discipline: Political science
- Institutions: University of Birmingham
- Notable works: Latter-day Anarchism: The Politics of the American Beat Generation (1964), The Gentle Anarchists: A Study of the Sarvodaya Movement for Non-Violent Revolution in India (1971), Nonviolent Revolution in India (1985)

Geoffrey Nielsen Ostergaard (25 July 1926 – 22 March 1990) was a British political scientist best known for his work on the connections between Gandhism and anarchism, on the British co-operative movement, and on syndicalism and workers' control. His books included The Gentle Anarchists: A Study of the Sarvodaya Movement for Non-Violent Revolution in India (1971), coauthored with Melville Currell, and Nonviolent Revolution in India (1985), both dealing with the Sarvodaya movement. He spent the majority of his academic career at the University of Birmingham.

== Early life ==
Geoffrey Nielsen Ostergaard was born on 25 July 1926 near Huntingdon, the son of a Danish immigrant. He attended Huntingdon Grammar School and Merton College, Oxford, where he studied philosophy, politics and economics, graduating in 1950. Ostergaard became an anarchist while serving in the Royal Air Force during the Second World War after reading Herbert Read's Poetry and Anarchism.

== Work and career ==
=== Overview ===
Ostergaard taught and conducted research at the University of Birmingham from 1953 until his death. He was also a Rockefeller Foundation fellow at the University of California, Berkeley, and a visiting professor at Osmania University, Hyderabad. Colin Ward wrote that "in his quiet, ironical way [Ostergaard] always relished the absurdities of the job he held" at Birmingham. Ward described Ostergaard as "a rock-like defender of academic freedom", and noted his "moral staunchness" in his support for the student revolts of the 1960s and for David Selbourne in his conflict with Ruskin College.

Ostergaard regularly contributed to anarchist and pacifist periodicals, sometimes publishing under the name Gaston Gerard (an anagram of G. N. Ostergaard), and was a trustee of Peace News and the Friends of Freedom Press. He was one of a number of writers who contributed to the development of anarcho-pacifist thought and action during and shortly after the Second World War; others included Read, Alex Comfort, Nicolas Walter, David Thoreau Wieck, Dorothy Day, and Paul Goodman. Drawing on Gandhism, he argued that nonviolence offered a way to reconcile political principles with tactics and to envision of a society without organized coercion.

=== Early career ===
Ostergaard pursued doctoral studies under G. D. H. Cole at Nuffield College, Oxford, completing a thesis entitled Public Ownership in Great Britain: A Study in the Development of Socialist Ideas in 1953.

In the 1950s Ostergaard published a series of articles on the co-operative movement. In Latter-day Anarchism: The Politics of the American Beat Generation (1964) he identified beats, beatniks and hipsters as "latter-day anarchists" sharing an eschatological or apocalyptic, rather than utopian, outlook, and the practice of Zen, which he described as "an intensely personal, subjective religion".

=== Work on the Sarvodaya movement ===
Ostergaard was a lifelong Gandhian. His work on Gandhism sought to reframe the thought of Mohandas Gandhi, Vinoba Bhave and Jayaprakash Narayan in terms of anarchism.

The Gentle Anarchists: A Study of the Sarvodaya Movement for Non-Violent Revolution in India (1971), coauthored with Melville Currell, is a comprehensive study of the Sarvodaya movement. Ostergaard and Currell identify Sarvodaya as an Indian form of anarchism or communitarian socialism and identify points of continuity between Sarvodaya and the anarchist tradition, including rejection of private property and representative government, belief in decentralization and a synthesis of freedom and equality, emphasis on local communities, and support for direct action. The bulk of the book is based on the findings from a survey of the movement's leaders, inquiring into their backgrounds, motivations, political beliefs and attitudes. Reviewing the book in the India Quarterly, Usha Mehta wrote that it evinced "the authors' deep understanding of Indian society and people and of their sympathy for the Sarvodaya movement." In his review for The Journal of Asian Studies, Anthony Parel described The Gentle Anarchists as "a most welcome addition to the literature of modern Indian politics in general and to Gandhian politics in particular". In a review in the Journal of Asian and African Studies, Frank F. Conlon questioned Ostergaard and Currell's methodology but identified the book as "an important first step" that would "reveal much about the condition of sarvodaya in contemporary India and ... stimulate further historical and sociological lines of enquiry." Marvin Dicker, reviewing in Social Forces, similarly questioned Ostergaard and Currell's methodology and noted their sympathy for the movement as a further weakness, but described the book as "a valuable contribution to the literature on social movements."

The Gentle Anarchists was followed by Nonviolent Revolution in India (1985). Ostergaard's account of the Sarvodaya movement here focuses on the period from 1969 to 1977 and on the figures of Bhave and Narayan and their differences, including their respective approaches to the Emergency of 1975–77 and the premiership of Indira Gandhi. Ostergaard argues for the superiority of Narayan's approach over Bhave's, though with significant caveats. Ostergaard also identifies the Sarvodaya movement as the only significant social movement motivated by the belief in nonviolent revolution. Looking to the movement's future, he argues the movement ought to adopt a more overtly anarchistic position including election boycotts and the construction of alternative political institutions from below. Reviewing the book in The Round Table, Antony Copley described the book as "scrupulously fair" and likely to "establish itself as amongst the most important books to appear on the extraordinary drama of Mrs Gandhi's India." In his review for Our Generation, Robert Graham wrote that "Ostergaard has provided a great service to all those interested in nonviolent social revolution by writing such a thorough and thoughtful analysis", but argued the book fails to provide sufficient background on Indian politics and political groupings.

== Personal life ==
Ostergaard married Eva Dryden in 1948. He and Eva spent several years living in India while he researched and wrote about Gandhism. They had a son, Magnus.

== Death and legacy ==
Ostergaard died of leukaemia in Birmingham on 22 March 1990. His papers are held at the University of Bradford Library.

== See also ==
- List of peace activists

== List of works ==
- Latter-day Anarchism: The Politics of the American Beat Generation (1964)
- Power in Co-operatives: A Study of the Internal Politics of British Retail Societies (1965), coauthored with A. H. Halsey
- The Gentle Anarchists: A Study of the Sarvodaya Movement for Non-Violent Revolution in India (1971), coauthored with Melville Currell ISBN 9780198271796
- Nonviolent Revolution in India (1985) ISBN 9780852832097
- Resisting the Nation State: The Pacifist and Anarchist Tradition (1985) ISBN 978-0902680357
- The Tradition of Workers' Control: Selected Writings by Geoffrey Ostergaard (1997) ISBN 9780900384912
