= Lynching of F. W. Stewart =

1898 lynching in Illinois, US

The lynching of F. W. Stewart occurred shortly after midnight on November 7, 1898, about a mile outside of Lacon, Illinois. Stewart had been accused of the assault of a miner's daughter in Toluca. About one hundred miners formed a mob and broke into the Marshall County jail to retrieve Stewart, whom they subsequently hanged.

== History ==
F. W. "George" Stewart was an African American from Toluca, Illinois, a mining town along the Atchison, Topeka, and Santa Fe Railway. Stewart had previously served a sentence in Peoria County for an 1896 burglary and had lived in Toluca for about four months following his release. Racial tensions were stoked by the fast growth of Toluca and the recent Virden Mine Riot further south in Illinois; according to the Chicago Tribune, "many colored men were forced to leave town because feeling was running so high. Among those who persisted in staying, however, was F. W. Stewart..." The United Mine Workers of America 1897-98 coal strike, and the presence of African-American strikebreakers, caused several Illinois mining towns to go "sundown".

Mary O'Brien, the daughter of the pit boss of the Toluca mine, was allegedly assaulted on November 4, 1898. A man hit O'Brien in the head with a rock, but she was able to cry for help, scaring the assailant away. O'Brien was unable to provide a description of her assailant. A mob of about one hundred miners formed and were supposedly led to Stewart's residence by a bloodhound. Although Stewart succeeded in initially convincing the mob of his innocence, local police quietly arrested him for his safety and held him in the Marshall County jail in the county seat of Lacon.

The mob of miners formed the next morning again and were dismayed that Stewart was in custody. In hopes of quelling the mob, Toluca's mayor and city marshal procured a confession from Stewart. However, after they returned to town to relay the news, the mob set out for Lacon. They camped a mile east of town and sent about fifty into town to retrieve Stewart.

The sheriff refused to turn Stewart over, so the miners used their implements to break down the door. They locked the sheriff in a side room and broke open Stewart's cell with a sledgehammer. A rope was placed around Stewart's neck, and the captive was escorted to the lynchers' camp and hanged from a white oak tree. The sheriff escaped and the camp was found, but the mob had disappeared. It was ruled that Stewart's death came at the hand of "persons unknown," and the sheriff declined to press charges due to "public sentiment." Stewart was buried in the local potter's field. William McKinley directed, the justice department to investigate the case that indicted 15 men on the charge of murdering Stewart ultimately one of them was charged in the Circuit court they were found guilty in sentenced to death in prison.

== See also ==
- List of lynchings and other homicides in Illinois
- Battle of Virden
- Pana riot
- Carterville Mine Riot
