= List of worker deaths in United States labor disputes =

The list of worker deaths in United States labor disputes captures known incidents of fatal labor-related violence in U.S. labor history, which began in the colonial era with the earliest worker demands around 1636 for better working conditions. It does not include killings of enslaved persons. According to a study in 1969, the United States has had the bloodiest and most violent labor history of any industrial nation in the world, and few industries were immune from that blot.

This list is not comprehensive. Several factors including multi-sided conflicts, physically remote locations, company-controlled locations, and exaggerated or biased original reporting make some of the death and injury counts uncertain. In all, the number of deaths documented total over 1,100.

The table below has three sections: violence perpetrated by law enforcement and companies' militia, armed detectives and guards; executions by the state; violence perpetrated by vigilantes, strikers, mobs and hate groups.

== By holders of authority ==
=== Law enforcement, companies' militia, armed detectives, owners, and guards ===
| Date | Location | Industry | Type of dispute | Workers killed by authorities | Notes |
|---|---|---|---|---|---|
| August 8, 1850 | Manhattan, NYC, NY | Garment | Strike | 2 | At least two tailors died as police confronted a street mob of about 300 strikers, with clubs. These were the "first recorded strike fatalities in U.S. history". |
| July 7, 1851 | Portage, New York | Railroad | Strike | 2 | Two striking workers of the New York and Erie Railroad were shot and killed by police officers. Strikers were dispersed the following morning by the state militia. |
| July 20, 1877 | Baltimore, MD | Railroad | Strike | 10 | During the Great Railroad Strike of 1877, first national strike in United States, National Guard regiments were ordered to Cumberland, Maryland, to face strikers. As they marched toward their train in Baltimore, violent street battles between the striking workers and the guardsmen erupted. Troops fired on the crowd, killing 10 and wounding 25. |
| July 21–22, 1877 | Pittsburgh, PA | Railroad | Strike | 40 | Great Railroad Strike of 1877: As militiamen approached and sought to protect the roundhouse, they bayoneted and fired on rock-throwing strikers, killing 20 people and wounding 29.The next day, the militia mounted an assault on the strikers, shooting their way out of the roundhouse and killing 20 more people. |
| July 21–28, 1877 | East St. Louis, IL and St. Louis, MO | Railroad, then general | Strike | up to about 18 | 1877 St. Louis general strike part of the Great Railroad Strike of 1877: The first general strike in the United States was ended when 3000 federal troops and 5000 deputized police had killed at least 18 people in skirmishes around the city. |
| July 23, 1877 | Reading, PA | Railroad | Strike | 10 | In the Reading Railroad massacre, part of the Great Railroad Strike of 1877, a unit of the Pennsylvania State Police ventured into the Seventh Street Cut (a man-made railway ravine) to address a train disabled by rioters. They were bombarded from above with bricks and stones, and fired a rifle volley into the crowd at the far end, killing ten. |
| July 25–26, 1877 | Chicago, IL | Railroad | Strike | 30 | Battle of the Viaduct, part of the Great Railroad Strike of 1877: Violence erupted between a crowd and police, federal troops, and state militia at the Halsted Street Viaduct. When it ended, 30 were dead. |
| August 1, 1877 | Scranton, PA | Coal Mining, Railroad | Strike | 4 | 1877 Scranton general strike, part of the Great Railroad Strike of 1877: The day after railroad workers conceded and returned to work, angry striking miners clashed with a 38-man posse partly led by William Walker Scranton, general manager of the Lackawanna Iron & Coal Company. When a posse member was shot in the knee, the posse responded by killing or fatally wounding four of the strikers. |
| 1877 | Philadelphia, PA | Railroad | Strike | 20–30 | Great Railroad Strike of 1877: 30–70 injured in addition to those killed |
| 1877 | Buffalo, NY | Railroad | Strike | 8 | Great Railroad Strike of 1877: 8 killed |
| May 4, 1885 | Lemont, Illinois | Quarry | Strike | 2 | Illinois state militia, pitted against "the most desperate and howling mob" of immigrant quarrymen and their women, throwing cobblestones, fired into the crowd. They killed two Polish strikers, Jacob Kugawa and Henry Stiller, and wounded several others with bayonets. |
| May 3, 1886 | Chicago, IL | Machinery mfg. | Strike | 2 | Striking workers held a rally outside a McCormick Harvesting Machine Company plant on the West Side of Chicago. When the end-of-the-workday bell sounded, workers surged to the gates to confront strikebreakers. Police fired on the crowd. Two McCormick workers were killed; some newspaper accounts said there were six fatalities. |
| May 5, 1886 | Milwaukee, WI | Building trades | Strike | 15 | Bay View Massacre: As protesters chanted for an 8-hour workday, 250 state militia were ordered to shoot into the crowd as it approached the iron rolling mill at Bay View, leaving 7 dead at the scene, including a 13-year-old boy. The Milwaukee Journal reported that eight more died within 24 hours. |
| November 5, 1887 | Pattersonville, LA | Sugar | Strike | as many as 20 | 10,000 sugar workers (90% of whom were black), organized by the Knights of Labor, went on strike. A battalion of national guardsmen supporting a sheriff's posse massacred as many as 20 people in the black village of Pattersonville, St. Mary Parish, Louisiana. |
| November 23, 1887 | Thibodaux, LA | Sugar | Strike | 37 or more estimated | Thibodaux Massacre: Louisiana Militia, aided by bands of prominent citizens, shot at least 35 unarmed black sugar workers striking to gain a dollar-per-day wage and lynched two strike leaders. "No credible official count of the victims was ever made; bodies continued to turn up in shallow graves outside of town for weeks to come." |
| July 6, 1889 | Duluth, Minnesota | Laborers | Strike | 2 | Several days of street riots and strikes by unorganized city laborers climaxed with an hour-long gun battle on Michigan Street with municipal police. Two Finnish strikers, Ed Johnson and Matt Mack, later died of their wounds. Another estimated 30 were wounded, and another young bystander was killed by a stray bullet. |
| April 3, 1891 | Morewood, PA | Coal mining | Strike | 9 | Morewood massacre: Miners struck the coke works of industrialist Henry Clay Frick for higher wages and an 8-hour work day. As a crowd of about 1000 strikers accompanied by a brass band marched on the company store, the 10th Regiment of the National Guard fired several volleys into the crowd, killing 6 strikers and fatally wounding 3. |
| July 6, 1892 | Homestead, PA | Steel | Strike | 9 | Homestead Massacre: An attempt by 300 Pinkerton guards hired by the company to enter the Carnegie Steel plant via the river was repulsed by strikers. In the ensuing gun battle, 9 strikers and 7 Pinkerton guards were shot and killed. |
| July 1892 | Coeur d'Alene, ID | Hardrock mining | Strike | 4 | Coeur d'Alene, Idaho labor strike of 1892: In July a union miner was killed by mine guards. Company guards also fired into a saloon where union men were sheltering, killing 3. |
| June 9, 1893 | near Lemont, Illinois | Construction | Strike | 4 | Dozens were injured and five were killed when quarrymen and canal workers clashed with replacement workers, local law enforcement, and the Illinois National Guard during construction of the Chicago Sanitary and Ship Canal. Four of the five were strikers: Gregor Kilka, Jacob (or Ignatz) Ast, Thomas Moorski, and Mike Berger |
| May 23, 1894 | Uniontown, PA | Coal mining | Strike | 5+ | The Bituminous coal miners' strike of 1894 was organized by the United Mine Workers in multiple mid-Western states on April 21, ending in late June. Among many other violent incidents in Illinois, Ohio, and elsewhere, five strikers were killed and eight wounded by guards near Uniontown, Pennsylvania, on May 23. |
| July 7, 1894 | Chicago, IL | Railroad | Strike | 30 or more estimated | Pullman Strike: An attempt by Eugene V. Debs to unionize the Pullman railroad car company in suburban Chicago developed into a strike on May 10, 1894. Other unions were drawn in. On June 26 a national rail strike of 125,000 workers paralyzed traffic in 27 states for weeks. By July 3 a mob peaking at perhaps 10,000 had gathered near the shoreline in south Chicago embarking on several straight days of vandalism and violence, burning switchyards and hundreds of railroad cars. Thousands of federal troops and deputy marshals were inserted over the governor's protests and clashed with rioters. The strike dissolved by August 2. Debs biographer Ray Ginger calculated thirty people killed in Chicago alone. Historian David Ray Papke, building on the work of Almont Lindsey published in 1942, estimated another 40 killed in other states. Property damage exceeded $80 million. |
| 1896–1897 | Leadville, CO | Silver mining | Strike | as many as 11 | Leadville Miners' strike: The union asked for a wage increase of 50 cents-per-day for those making less than $3-per-day, to restore a 50-cent cut imposed in 1893. The county sheriff and his deputies supported the strikers. Leadville city police took the side of the mine owners, recruited new officers from Denver, and "apparently kept up a near-constant campaign of harassment and violence against union members throughout the strike." As many as six union men were killed during the strike, by strikebreakers, police, or under mysterious circumstances. Four more union men died when they joined about 50 strikers in a nighttime rifle and dynamite attack on the Coronado and Emmett mines; the attackers burned the Coronado shafthouse and killed a firefighter trying to extinguish the blaze. |
| September 10, 1897 | Lattimer, PA | Coal mining | Strike | 19 | Lattimer Massacre: 19 unarmed striking Polish, Lithuanian and Slovak coal miners were killed and 36 wounded by the Luzerne County sheriff's posse for refusing to disperse during a peaceful march. Most were shot in the back. |
| October 12, 1898 | Virden, IL | Coal mining | Strike | 8 | Virden Massacre: The Chicago-Virden Coal Company attempted to break a strike by importing black replacement workers. After union workers stopped a train transporting non-union workers and a tense standoff, eight of the union workers were killed when guards opened fire from the train. Six guards were also killed and 30 persons were wounded. |
| started May 1899 | Coeur d'Alene, ID | Hardrock mining | Organizing drive | 3 | Coeur d'Alene, Idaho labor confrontation of 1899: Following a mass attack in which a non-union ore mill was destroyed by dynamite, and two men were shot and killed by union miners, President McKinley sent in U.S. Army troops, who, upon the order of Idaho officials, arrested nearly every adult male. About 1000 men were confined in a pine board prison surrounded by a 6-foot barbed wire fence patrolled by armed soldiers. Most were released within a week, but more than a hundred remained for months, and some were held until December 1899. Three workers died in the primitive conditions. |
| June 10, 1900 | St. Louis, MO | Streetcar | Strike | 3 or more | 1900 St. Louis streetcar strike: The Police Board swore in 2500 citizens in a posse commanded by John H. Cavender, who had played a similar paramilitary role in the 1877 general strike. On the evening of June 10, men of that posse fatally shot three strikers returning from a picnic and left 14 others wounded. Between May 7 and the end of the strike in September, 14 people had been killed. |
| July 3, 1901 | Telluride, CO | Mining | Strike | 4 | About 250 armed striking union miners took hidden positions around an entrance to the Smuggler-Union mine complex, and demanded that the nonunion miners leave the mine. One striker and two strikebreakers died in the ensuing gunfight. The strikers were more numerous and better-armed, and after several hours, the strikebreakers agreed to surrender, and assistant company manager Arthur Collins agreed to stop work at the mine. The following year, Collins was killed by a shotgun fired through a window into his home. |
| July 30 through October 2, 1901 | San Francisco, CA | Multiple | Strike | 2 | Waterfront workers struck beginning July 30, an action that triggered sympathy strikes from bakers, sailors and other sectors. The city was in a commercial standstill by late August, with hundreds of ships stacked up in the bay unable to unload, while a violent struggle played out on the streets. Four were killed (of whom two were strikers), and some 250 were wounded. |
| July 1, 1902, and October 9, 1902 | Pennsylvania | Coal mining | Strike | at least 2 | The Coal Strike of 1902 in Pennsylvania caused about eight known casualties, two of them confirmed as strikers. On July 1, Coal and Iron Police guarding a Lehigh Valley Coal Company colliery in Old Forge were attacked by nighttime gunfire. The guards returned fire, and the next morning immigrant striker Anthony Giuseppe was found dead by a gunshot outside the site. On October 9, striker William Durham was loitering near a non-striker's house, which had been partly destroyed by dynamite the previous week, when a soldier ordered him to halt. He refused, and the soldier shot and killed him. |
| February 25, 1903 | Stanaford, West Virginia | Coal mining | Strike | 6 | In the so-called Battle of Stanaford a volunteer armed posse of 30 led by federal, county and labor detectives conducted a dawn raid against a houseful of black striking coal miners, shooting three of them to death. Another three white strikers were also killed in related violence. |
| June 8, 1904 | Dunnville, CO | Hardrock mining | Strike | 1 | Colorado Labor Wars: In December 1903, the governor declared martial law. The Colorado National Guard, under Adjutant General Sherman Bell, took the side of the mine owners against the miners. Bell announced that "the military will have sole charge of everything ..." and suspended the Bill of Rights, including freedom of assembly and the right to bear arms. Union leaders were arrested and either thrown in the bullpen, or banished. The Victor Daily Record was placed under military censorship; all WFM-friendly information was prohibited. On June 8, 130 armed soldiers and deputies went to the small mining camp of Dunnville, 14 miles south of Victor, to arrest union miners. When they arrived, 65 miners were stationed behind rocks and trees on the hills above the soldiers. One of the miners shot at the troops, who returned fire. There were 7 minutes of steady gunfire, followed by an hour of occasional gunfire. Miner John Carley was killed in the gunfight. The much better-armed soldiers prevailed, and arrested 14 of the miners. |
| April 7–July, 1905 | Chicago, IL | Garment mfg., Teamsters | Strike | as many as 21 | 1905 Chicago Teamsters' strike: Riots erupted on April 7 and continued almost daily until mid-July. Sometimes thousands of striking workers would clash with strikebreakers and armed police each day. By late July, when the strike ended, 21 people had been killed and a total of 416 injured. |
| April 16, 1906 | Windber, PA | Coal mining | Strike | 3 | Two weeks into a strike by as many as 5000 miners against the Berwind-White Coal Company, the striking miners held a large meeting, at which an infiltrator from the company was discovered. The resulting disturbance led to the arrest and jailing of several miners. A large group assembled at the jail to bail out those arrested, but the sheriff refused to release them. When a brick was thrown at the jail's window, private armed guards hired earlier in the strike by the company opened fire on the crowd, killing three miners (Steve Popovich, Matus Tomen, Simeon Vojcek), fatally wounding a 10-year-old boy, and wounding 18 others. |
| February 19, 1907 | Milwaukee, WI | Ironworking | Strike | 1 | Strike leader Peter J. Cramer of the International Molders Union was targeted and severely beaten by "labor detectives" hired by Allis-Chalmers. He died of his injuries on December 10, 1907. His attacker was tried for assault, his wife reached an out-of-court settlement with Allis-Chalmers, and the killing exposed a pattern of armed intimidation of strikers. |
| May 7, 1907 | San Francisco, CA | Streetcar | Strike | 2 to 6 | San Francisco Streetcar Strike of 1907: As the strike loomed, United Railroads contracted with the nationally known "King of the Strikebreakers", James Farley, for four hundred replacement workers. Farley's armed workers took control of the entire streetcar system. Violence started two days into the strike when a shootout on Turk Street left 2 dead and about 20 injured. Of the 31 deaths from shootings and streetcar accidents, 25 were among passengers. |
| December 25, 1908 | Stearns, KY | Coal mining | Organizing | 1 | On Christmas Day U.S. Marshals battled a number of union organizers at the McFerrin Hotel in Stearns as they sought to arrest Berry Simpson. The hotel was set ablaze by order of the marshal, leaving the hotel burned out, many wounded, and two shot dead: Deputy U.S. Marshal John Mullins and organizer Richard Ross. The employer was the Stearns Coal Company, and the organizers attached to the United Mine Workers. |
| May 1, 1909 | Great Lakes region | Maritime workers | Strike | 5 | Three maritime unions, primarily the Lake Seamen's Union, struck a multistate Great Lakes shipping cartel called the Lake Carriers' Association. By late November 1909 five union members had been "shot and killed by strikebreakers and private police." The difficult and fruitless strike dragged on until 1912. |
| August 22, 1909 | McKees Rocks, PA | Railroad | Strike | 4 to as many as 8 | Pressed Steel Car strike of 1909: At least 12 people died when strikers battled with private security agents and Pennsylvania State Police mounted on horseback. Eight men died on August 22, including 4 strikers. By the time the rioting was over, a dozen men were dead and more than 50 were wounded. |
| March 9, 1910 – July 1, 1911 | Westmoreland County, PA | Coal mining | Strike | 6 (plus 9 miners' wives) | Westmoreland County coal strike of 1910–1911: 70 percent of the miners were Slovak immigrants. Employers used force to intimidate striking miners, partially paying the cost for the Coal and Iron Police, local law enforcement and the Pennsylvania State Police.: May 8, 1910 – Yukon, PA: As 25 sheriff's deputies and state police vainly searched a boarding house, a crowd of striking miners gathered and ridiculed them. The deputies then fired into the crowd, killing one and injuring 30.; May 1910 – Export, PA: Miners who were walking home passed by coal company property, whereupon 20 sheriff's deputies and State Police attacked and severely beat them. One miner, trying to protect a child in his arms, was killed.; May 1910 – State police stopped four immigrant miners who did not speak English to question them. A bilingual miner came by and told the four to leave, but the troopers chased, shot and killed the fifth man, allegedly in cold blood.; July 1910 – South Greensburg: Striking miners had obtained a permit to march, but as they began, deputy sheriffs on horseback stopped them. In defiance of the local police chief, the deputies charged with their horses, swinging clubs and then firing into the crowd, killing a miner.; A legislator's survey found that violence significantly increased after the arrival of the State Police, and that almost all acts of violence committed by state troopers were without provocation: Mounted State Police routinely charged onto sidewalks or into crowds, severely injuring men, women and children.; Severe beatings of citizens and striking miners for no reason were common, with troopers resisting local police attempts to stop them and breaking into homes without warrants.; State Police troopers shot up towns and fired indiscriminately into crowds and tent cities (killing and wounding sleeping women and children). |
| July 28, 1910 | Brooklyn, NYC, NY | Sugar Mfg. | Strike | 1 | A striking worker identified as Walla Noblowsky was shot multiple times and died instantly when a labor action against American Sugar Refining Company became a neighborhood melee, with outnumbered police dodging bricks thrown from tenement roofs. Thirty more were hurt. |
| December 3 and 15, 1910 | Chicago, IL | Garment workers | Strike | 2 | Two of the five people killed in the 1910 Chicago Garment workers' strike were strikers killed by private detectives. The first was Charles Lazinskas, killed by a private detective on December 3, and Frank Nagreckis was shot and killed by a special policeman while picketing on the 15th. |
| January 29, 1912 | Lawrence, MA | Textile | Strike | 1 | 1912 Lawrence textile strike: A police officer fired into a crowd of strikers, killing Anna LoPizzo. |
| March 28, 1912; May 7, 1912 | San Diego, CA | - | free speech demonstrations | 2 | In the San Diego free speech fight, Michael Hoy died after a police assault in jail, and Joseph Mikolash, was killed by police in the IWW headquarters in San Diego on May 7. |
| April 18, 1912 – July 1913 | Kanawha County, WV | Coal mining | Strike | up to 50 violent deaths (estimated) | Paint Creek Mine War: a confrontation between striking coal miners and coal operators in Kanawha County, West Virginia, centered on the area between two streams, Paint Creek and Cabin Creek. 12 miners were killed on July 26, 1912, at Mucklow. On February 7, 1913, the county sheriff's posse attacked the Holly Grove miners' camp with machine guns, killing striker Cesco Estep. Many more than 50 deaths among miners and their families were indirectly caused, as a result of starvation and malnutrition. |
| July 7, 1912 | Grabow, LA | Lumber | Strike | 4 | Grabow Riot: Galloway Lumber Company guards fired on striking demonstrators of the Brotherhood of Timber Workers, causing 4 deaths (including Decatur Hall) and 50 wounded. |
| February 5, 1913 | Rochester, NY | Garment | Strike | 1 | While on strike for better working conditions, about 700 people picketed a clothing shop owned by Valentine Sauter. When picketers began to throw stones, Sauter used a shotgun to fire into the crowd, killing 17-year-old Ida Braiman and injuring three others. Although Sauter was arrested and charged with first-degree murder, a grand jury declined to indict him. |
| April 24, 1913 | Hopedale, MA | Automatic Loom mfg. | Strike | 1 | 1 worker named Emidio Bacchiocci killed while picketing during strike at the Draper Company |
| June 11, 1913 | New Orleans, LA | Banana | Strike | 2 | Police shot at maritime workers who were striking against the United Fruit Company, killing one and wounding 4 others. Robert Neumann, one of the wounded, would die a few days later. |
| June 29, 1913 | Paterson, NJ | Textile | Strike | 1 | Two were killed in the 1913 Paterson silk strike: bystander Valentino Modestino fatally shot by a private guard on April 17, 1913, and striking worker Vincenzo Madonna fatally shot by a strikebreaker on June 29. |
| August 14, 1913 | Seeberville, MI | Copper mining | Strike | 2 | Copper Country strike of 1913–1914: Sheriff's deputies visited a boarding house with the intent to arrest one of the boarders who had trespassed on company property while taking a shortcut home. The suspect, John Kalan, resisted arrest and went inside the house. As the deputies prepared to leave, someone tossed a bowling pin at them. The deputies opened fire into the crowded home, killing Alois Tijan and Steve Putich and injuring two others. The people inside the house were unarmed.^{p. 326} |
| 1913–14 | Area from Trinidad to Walsenburg, southern CO | Coal mining | Strike | up to 47 estimated (in addition to Ludlow) | Amid escalating violence in the coalfields and pressure from mine operators, the governor called out the National Guard, which arrived at the mining towns in October 1913. After the Ludlow Massacre in April 1914, for ten days striking miners at the other tent colonies went to war. They attacked and destroyed mines, fighting pitched battles with mine guards and militia along a 40-mile front from Trinidad to Walsenburg. The strike ended in defeat for the UMWA in December 1914. |
| November 4, 1913 | Indianapolis, IN | Streetcar | Strike | 4 | Indianapolis streetcar strike of 1913: The Terminal and Traction Company hired 300 professional strikebreakers from the Pinkerton Agency to operate the streetcars. When the strikebreakers attempted to move the streetcars into their carhouses, the crowd attacked the policemen who were protecting the strikebreakers. Strikebreakers then opened fire on the crowd, killing four. |
| April 20, 1914 | Ludlow, CO | Mining | Strike | 5 (plus 2 women, 12 children) | Ludlow Massacre: On Greek Easter morning, 177 company guards engaged by John D. Rockefeller Jr. and other mine operators, and sworn into the State Militia just for the occasion, attacked a union tent camp with machine guns, then set it afire. Luka Vahernik, 50, was shot in the head. Louis Tikas and two other miners were captured, shot and killed by the militia. 5 miners, 2 women and 12 children in total died in the attack. |
| January 19, 1915 | Carteret, NJ | Fertilizer mfg. | Strike | 5 | Leibig Fertilizer strike: In an unprovoked attack, 40 deputies fired on strikers at the Williams & Clark Fertilizing Company after the strikers had stopped a train to check for strikebreakers and had found none. |
| July 20–21, 1915 | Bayonne, NJ | Oil | Strike | 4 | Bayonne refinery strikes of 1915–1916: During a strike by stillcleaners at Standard Oil of New Jersey and Tidewater Petroleum, armed strikebreakers protected by police fired into a crowd of strikers and sympathizers, killing four striking workers (John Sterancsak was one). |
| August 2, 1915 | Massena, NY | Aluminum | Strike | 1 | In 1915, workers revolted at the Mellon family's aluminum mill and took over every section of the plant. The sheriff of St. Lawrence County deputized businessmen to break the strike. New York Governor Whitman sent in three companies of the state militia, armed with bayonets, to disperse a crowd of hundreds of workers. The following day, striker Joseph Solunski died of a gunshot wound in an Ogdensburg hospital. |
| January 1916 | East Youngstown, OH | Steel | Strike | 3 | Youngstown Strike of 1916: When two trainloads of strikebreakers from the South were smuggled into the Youngstown Sheet & Tube Co. plant, angry strikers assembled at the mill gates. Mill guards fired into the crowd, killing 3 strikers. A riot then began that burned six square blocks of the city. A grand jury found that the guards had precipitated the disturbance. |
| May 1916 | Braddock, PA | Steel | Strike | 2 | Strikers had arranged to parade outside the Carnegie Steel Co. plant, but the company had stationed an armed force inside the plant. When the paraders arrived, the guards opened fire, shooting strikers and bystanders. Two strikers were killed.^{pp. 240–241} |
| June–July, 1916 | Area of Chisholm, MN | Iron mining | Strike | 3 | Mesabi Range strike of 1916: On June 22, 1916, in Virginia, MN, miner John Alar was shot and killed in a confrontation between police and a group of pickets. Shortly afterward, a miner left his shift after being paid less than the contracted rate, helping to ignite the Mesabi Range strike of 1916. The IWW supported the strike for better pay and shorter hours. On July 3, a clash between guards and several strikers left a guard and a bystander dead. |
| November 5, 1916 | Everett, WA | Shingle mfg. | Strike | 5 or more | Everett Massacre: 200 citizen deputies under the authority of the Snohomish County sheriff waited for the arrival by passenger ship of IWW workers coming to support the strikers. A 10-minute gun battle ensued, with most gunfire coming from the dock. The IWW listed 5 dead with 27 wounded, although as many as 12 members may have been killed (some people were last seen drowning in the harbor waters). Two deputies were killed by fellow deputies lay dead with 16 or 20 others wounded, including Sheriff McRae. The two businessman-deputies that were shot were actually shot in the back by fellow deputies; their injuries were not caused by Wobbly gunfire. |
| February 21, 1917 | Philadelphia, PA | Sugar | Strike | 1 | 1 striker, Martinus Petkus, killed, many beaten, in sugar mill strike |
| May 31, 1917 | Riverside, OR | Sheep-shearing | Strike | 1 | A negotiator for the strikers named Shoemaker was shot and killed by a sheep rancher. |
| August 25, 1919 | Charlotte, NC | Streetcar | Strike | 5 | Five men were killed and more than a dozen wounded by police guarding streetcar barns of the Southern Public Utilities Company. As a crowd of striking conductors and motormen surged, over 100 shots were fired. Operators of street cars in Charlotte and other cities had gone on strike on August 10 for higher wages and union recognition. |
| August 26, 1919 | Brackenridge, PA | Steel | Strike | 2 | United Mine Workers' organizer Fannie Sellins was riddled with bullets by Steel Trust gunmen on the eve of a nationwide steel strike. Joseph Starzeleski, a miner, was also gunned down that same day. |
| 1919 | several | Steel | Strike | 18 | Steel Strike of 1919: 18 strikers were killed, hundreds seriously injured, and thousands jailed over the course of the strike.^{p. 247} |
| September 8, 1919 | Hammond, Indiana | Steel | Strike | 3 | In the East Hammond riot, striking workers of the Standard Steel Car Company in Hammond, Indiana, clashed with local police and company guards sworn in as police. After weeks of unrest and increasing lawlessness requiring state troops, three strikers were killed (Stanley Skis, George Rosko, Stephen Krowczek) and one soldier (Lawrence Dudek). Another fifty were wounded. |
| September 23, 1919 | Lackawanna, NY | Steel | Strike | 2 | Casimer Mazurek, 26-year-old decorated World War veteran and steelworker, was killed by Lackawanna Steel Company police when they fired into a strike gathering of 3,000 men, women, and children assembled at Gate No. 3. On September 25, Maciecz Buczkowski, a 38-year-old Polish laborer, succumbed to his wounds after being shot in the head at the September 23 gathering. |
| April 21, 1920 | Butte, MT | Copper mining | Strike | 1 | Anaconda Road Massacre: A strike by Butte miners was suppressed with gunfire when deputized mine guards suddenly fired upon unarmed picketers. 17 were shot in the back as they tried to flee, and one man died. |
| May 19, 1920 | Matewan, WV | Coal mining | Strike | 3 (Bob Mullins, Tot Tinsley, Cabel Testerman) | Battle of Matewan: Baldwin-Felts agents and 13 of the mining company's managers arrived to evict miners and their families from the mine camp. Chief of Police Sid Hatfield tried to arrest the detectives for illegally evicting miners and carrying weapons. A gun battle ensued, resulting in the deaths of 7 private agents, 2 miners, and Mayor Cabel Testerman. |
| 1920 | Philadelphia, PA | Shipping | Strike | 5 | 5 killed, 20 injured in longshoremen's strike |
| October 2, 1920 | Hannaford, ND | Railroad | | 1 | Joe Bagley, a reportedly well-known member of the IWW, was shot and killed by Special Agent Nolan of the Great Northern railway. |
| 1920 | Walker County, Alabama | Coal mining | Strike | at least 16 | 1920 Alabama coal strike: The Alabama miners' strike was a statewide strike of the UMWA against coal mine operators. On December 23, 1920, local union official Adrian Northcutt of Nauvo was summoned out of his home by soldiers of Company M of the Alabama Guard, who fired 7 shots, killing him.^{p. 9} |
| 1921 | Wheeling, WV | Steel | Strike | 1 | Elmer Cost, a striker, was shot and killed by a guard.^{p. 251} |
| August 1, 1921 | Welch, WV | Coal mining | Strike | 2 (Chief of Police Sid Hatfield and Ed Chambers) | On the steps of the McDowell County Courthouse, the gunmen of the Baldwin-Felts Agency avenged the deaths of their colleagues by shooting to death two men as they and their wives prepared to enter the court building. |
| August 25 – September 2, 1921 | Logan County, WV | Coal mining | Strike, organizing | up to 100 estimated | Battle of Blair Mountain: the largest labor uprising in United States history and the largest organized armed uprising since the American Civil War. During an attempt by the miners to unionize, and following the murder of Sid Hatfield, 10,000 armed coal miners confronted 3000 lawmen and Baldwin-Felts strikebreakers, who were backed by coal mine operators. In the summer of 1921 in Mingo County, hundreds of miners were arrested without habeas corpus and other basic legal rights. Talk spread of a march to free those confined miners, end martial law, and organize the county. In Kanawha County, up to 13,000 miners gathered and began marching toward Logan County on August 24. The reviled anti-union sheriff of Logan County, Don Chafin set up defenses on Blair Mountain, with the nation's largest private armed force of 2000. By August 29, battle was fully joined. Chafin's men, though outnumbered, had the advantage of higher positions and better weaponry. Private hired planes dropped homemade bombs on the miners near the towns of Jeffery, Sharples and Blair. Army bombers were used for aerial surveillance. Sporadic gun battles continued for a week. Sources differ greatly on the number of men wounded and the number killed. Best estimates put the death toll at sixteen. On September 2, federal troops arrived by presidential order, and the miners started heading home the next day. About one million rounds were fired in the battle. |
| August 27, 1921 | Sharples, WV | Coal mining | Arrest attempt | at least 2 | Posse of 70 to 100 deputies and state police went to the small mining community of Sharples to arrest miners and their leaders. The confrontation resulted in a gunfight in which at least two miners were killed and two others were wounded. |
| August 2, 1922 | Buffalo, NY | Streetcar | Strike | 1 | John Chrosniak, a striking streetcar conductor, was killed when a city patrolman on a moving streetcar fired four shots into an obstructing crowd of 20 protesters throwing stones. The motorman was also sprayed with acid in the incident. |
| September 9, 1924 | Hanapēpē, Kauaʻi, HI | Sugar | Strike | 16 | Hanapēpē massacre: Sixteen striking Filipino sugar workers on the Hawaiʻi island of Kauaʻi were killed by police; four police also died. Many of the surviving strikers were jailed, then deported. |
| November 21, 1927 | Serene, CO | Coal mining | Strike | 6 | Columbine Mine massacre: State police and mine guards fired pistols, rifles and a machine gun into a group of five hundred striking miners and their wives. |
| February 9, 1929 | Imperial, PA | Coal mining | Police brutality | 1 | Three members of the Coal and Iron Police beat miner John Barkoski to death. He had gone to his mother-in-law's home and there fell into the hands of two coal and iron policemen employed by the Pittsburgh Coal Company. Eyewitnesses said one of them had launched an unprovoked attack on Barkoski, who received a laceration of the left cheek, five or six head wounds, two broken ribs and a fractured nose. Later at police barracks over the course of four hours, according to trial testimony, a third officer beat Barkoski with a strap while he lay semiconscious on the floor, twisted his ears until the miner cried aloud, and twisted his broken nose until he lapsed again into unconsciousness. Then he beat Barkoski over the chest with a poker until the poker bent, straightened the implement and beat the man again. He stripped the miner to the waist in order to better use a strap and kicked Barkoski until the miner's body rolled over and over on the floor. The original attacker also beat Barkoski, kicked him, struck him over the head with knucklers, and slapped him on the arms and legs and neck with his blackjack. The next morning he was taken to a hospital where he died. A jury acquitted the three officers of murder. |
| October 2, 1929 | Marion, NC | Textile | Strike | 6 | A sheriff and 11 deputies attempting to disperse a picket line opened fire on strikers, killing 6 and wounding 17 others. Most of the dead and wounded were shot in the back. |
| 1931–1939 | Harlan County, KY | Coal mining | Various | 13 | The Harlan County War was a violent, nearly decade-long conflict between miners and mine operators who adamantly resisted unionization. It consisted of skirmishes, executions, bombings, and strikes. The incidents involved coal miners and union organizers on one side and coal firms and law enforcement officials on the other. Before its conclusion, state and federal troops would occupy the county more than half a dozen times. |
| March 7, 1932 | Dearborn, MI | Auto | Demonstration by unemployed workers | 5 | Ford Massacre: Thousands of unemployed hunger marchers sought to present petitions to Ford Motor Company at the end of a planned march to the Dearborn plant. Dearborn police and Ford security guards opened fire on the marchers. As protestors retreated, machine guns were fired at them. 4 workers were shot to death and over 60 were injured, many by gunshot wounds. Three months later, another worker died of his injuries. |
| April 30, 1933 | Wilder, TN | Coal mining | Strike | 1 | A coal-miners strike at Wilder ended shortly after the homicide of United Mine Workers union leader Barney Graham in front of the company store by company mine guards Jack "Shorty" Green and Doc Thompson on April 30, 1933. |
| October 5, 1933 | Ambridge, PA | Steel | Strike | 1 | Executives at Jones & Laughlin Steel in Aliquippa, PA recruited a group of 200 deputies, armed them with tear gas and rifles, and sent them armed across the river to a sister plant that was on strike. They attacked a picket line outside the Spang-Chalfant Seamless Tube Mill, shooting 21 strikers, killing one man with a bullet to the neck.^{p. 256.} |
| October 10, 1933 | Pixley and Arvin, CA | Agriculture | Strike | 4 | San Joaquin cotton strike: Up to 18,000 cotton workers had gone on strike. About 30 armed ranchers surrounded a meeting of strikers in Pixley and fired on them, killing 3. That same day, a group of striking grape-pickers faced armed growers' men at a farm near Arvin, 60 miles (97 km) south of Pixley. After a stand-off, the two sides attacked each other (the workers using wooden poles, the growers' men using their rifle butts). A shot rang out, killing a striking worker. 8 growers were charged with murder. |
| 1934 | Alabama | Textile | Strike | 1 | 1 union leader killed, 2 aides beaten, in textile strike |
| May 15, 1934 | San Pedro, CA | Shipping | Strike | 2 | 1934 West Coast waterfront strike: When 500 strikers attacked and tried to set fire to a ship housing strikebreakers in San Pedro, police unsuccessfully tried to stop them with tear gas, then shot into the crowd, killing strikers Dick Parker and John Knudsen. |
| May 24, 1934 | Toledo, OH | Auto | Strike | 2 | Electric Auto-Lite Strike: Ohio National Guardsmen guarding the Auto-Lite plant fired into the crowd, killing Frank Hubay and Steve Cyigon, who were strike sympathizers. At least 15 others were shot and wounded. |
| July 27, 1934 | Kohler, WI | Beer | Strike | 2 | During the Kohler strike of 1934, a crowd of several hundred threw stones, breaking windows at various Kohler company buildings. Special deputies used tear gas a number of times to disperse the crowd, forcing the crowd to move to the next building. At one point the guards fired guns, killing strikers Lee Wakefield and Harry Englemann. In addition, 47 "men, women and boys were wounded, gassed, and injured". |
| June 30, 1934 | Seattle, WA | Shipping | Strike | 1 | 1934 West Coast waterfront strike: Upon hearing that scab crews were about to take two oil tankers out of the port, union members went to the dock. When the longshoremen tried to get past the dock's gates, they were ambushed by guards. Worker Shelvy Daffron was shot in the back and later died. |
| July 5, 1934 | San Francisco, CA | Shipping | Strike | 2 | 1934 West Coast waterfront strike: When striking longshoremen surrounded a San Francisco police car and tried to tip it over, the police shot into the air, and then fired into the crowd, killing Nick Bordoise (originally named Nick Counderakis) and Howard Sperry. |
| July 12, 1934 | Portland, OR | Shipping | Strike | 1 | 1934 West Coast waterfront strike: Portland police chief ordered his force to "shoot to kill" picketers at the dock. Four were shot, one of whom died of his wounds. |
| July 19, 1934 | Seattle, WA | Shipping | Strike | 1 | 1934 West Coast Waterfront Strike: Olaf Helland was a Sailor on strike supporting Seattle Longshoremen, During the Battle of Smith cove a Police Officer shot an unexploded tear gas cannister into the back of Olaf Helland's Head. Olaf Helland Died a few hours later at a hospital. |
| July 20, 1934 | Minneapolis, MN | Trucking, General | Strike | 2 | Minneapolis general strike of 1934: 50 armed policemen were escorting a non-union truck that was then cut off by a vehicle carrying picketers. The police opened fire on the vehicle with shotguns and then turned their guns on the strikers filling the streets. Two strikers were killed and 67 wounded. |
| September 2, 1934 | Trion, GA | Textile | Strike | 1 | Textile workers strike (1934): A picketer and mill guard died in a shootout. |
| September 2, 1934 | Augusta, GA | Textile | Strike | 2 | Textile workers strike (1934): Guards killed two picketers. |
| September 6, 1934 | Honea Path, SC | Textile | Strike | 7 | Chiquola Mill Massacre, part of the Textile workers strike (1934): Deputies stationed in and around Chiquola Mill opened fire on picketing textile workers with pistols and shotguns. They killed 7 and wounded about 30. |
| September 12, 1934 | Woonsocket, RI | Textile | Strike | 1 | Textile workers strike (1934): National Guardsmen fired on strikers at the Rayon plant, killing one and injuring three others, one day after the governor placed the area under martial law. |
| 1935 | Pennsylvania | Coal mining | Strike | 7 | 7 killed, unknown number injured in Pennsylvania anthracite strikes |
| 1935 | St. Clare County, AL | Coal mining | Strike | 1 | 1 striker killed, 6 others wounded in anthracite strike |
| 1935 | Rossville, GA | Textile | Strike | unknown | unknown numbers killed and injured in textile strike |
| 1935 | Alabama | Iron mining | Strike | 2 | 2 striking iron miners killed |
| 1935 | Pikeville, KY | Coal mining | Picket | 1 | 1 picketing coal miner killed |
| 1935 | Detroit, MI | Auto | Strike | 1 | 1 striker killed at Motor Products Corp. |
| April 17, 1935 | Toronto, OH | Clay | Strike | 1 | One striking clay worker (Andy Latiska or Lastivka) was killed outright and several were wounded as guards fired into a crowd of 100 strikers. |
| May 24, 1935 | Tacoma, Washington | Beer | Strike | 1 | A Teamsters picket, William Usatalo, was shot and killed on the street in Tacoma by armed guards employed by brewery owner Peter Marinoff in a union dispute. Both the shooter and Marinoff himself were sentenced to 20 years in prison for manslaughter. Marinoff's conviction was overturned. |
| June 21, 1935 | Humboldt County, CA | Lumber | Strike | 3 | Pacific Northwest lumber strike: three lumber workers were killed in a fight with police and strikebreakers outside of the Holmes-Eureka lumber mill (Wilhelm Kaarte died immediately; Harold Edlund and Paul Lampella, mortally wounded, died on June 24 and August 7, respectively). |
| September 11, 1935 | Minneapolis, MN | Ornamental iron | Strike | 2 | After strikers threw rocks at plant windows, police targeted a large crowd of strikers for tear gas and pistol fire. Eugene Caspar and Melvin Bjorklund were shot and killed. |
| October 21 and November 25, 1935 | Port Arthur and Houston, Texas | Longshoremen | Strike | 2 | 1935 Gulf Coast longshoremen's strike: Following a walkout of longshoremen on October 1, 1935, uncounted strikers and strikebreakers were beaten and injured in sporadic violence. Three men were killed in Houston, 3 at Port Arthur, 1 at Beaumont, 3 at Lake Charles, La., 2 at New Orleans, and 2 at Mobile. At least two of the reported 14 people killed were strikers: ILA member Etienne Christ shot to death in Port Arthur, Texas, on 10/21, and striker Samuel L. Brandt shot to death in Houston on 11/25. Strikebreakers allegedly fired the shots that killed Brandt. Striker Ernest Dukes was shot dead by a policeman on October 30 in Mobile. Two special guards protecting non-union workers were killed by sniping pickets on October 22 in Lake Charles. |
| 1936 | Closter, NJ | Braid | Strike | 1 | 1 striker killed, Acme Braid Co. |
| 1936 | Willamette, OR | Lumber | Strike | 2 | 2 picketers killed in logging strike |
| May 30, 1937 | Chicago, IL | Steel | Strike | 10 | Little Steel strike at Republic Steel: Police opened fire, killing 10 protestors in the Memorial Day massacre of 1937. |
| June 19, 1937 | Youngstown, OH | Steel | Strike | 2 | Women's day massacre: In the "Little Steel" strike at Republic Steel, a gunfight between heavily armed police officers and scantily armed protesters lasted into the night, leaving dozens injured and two dead. |
| June 25, 1937 | Cambridge, MD | Packing | Strike | 1 | One picketer named John Cephas was killed at the strike at Phillips Packing Co. by a company truck that deliberately swerved to hit him. |
| June 28, 1937 | Beaver Falls, PA | Steel | Strike | 1 | Picketers trying to prevent the night shift from entering the plant fought briefly with deputy sheriffs. One striker was fatally wounded by a tear gas shell fired by one of the deputies. |
| July 9, 1937 | Alcoa, TN | Aluminum | Strike | 2 | Several hundred picketers tried to stop a truck from entering the plant, and then rushed the plant gate, guarded by local police. One striker and one policeman were killed by gunfire; accounts differ as to which side fired first. The governor sent in national guardsmen to prevent further violence. |
| July 11, 1937 | Massillon, OH | Steel | Strike | 3 | "Little Steel" strike: The local police force opened fire on strikers, killing 3. |
| 1937 | Cleveland, OH | Steel | Strike | 1 or 2 | Other killings occurred during the "Little Steel" strike. |
| September 9, 1938 | Hatboro, PA | Garment | Strike | 1 | Striker Raymond Cooke was killed at Oscar Nebel Hosiery Company, shot to death by the town's police chief. |
| 1940 | Ohio | Coal mining | Strike | 1 | 1 picketer killed, 2 wounded during coal strike |
| February 6, 1946 | Gridley, IL | Railroad | Strike | 2 | A 19-month strike on the Toledo, Peoria and Western Railway involved some gun-shooting committed by union strikers. In Gridley, some armed guards hired by the railway shot five strikers. Two were killed, while three were wounded. |
| March 1959 | Letcher and Perry Counties, Kentucky | Coal mining | Strike | at least three | A United Mine Workers strike called on March 9 grew violent as the union used mass picketing tactics, and launched assaults against tipples using dynamite and arson. Firefights were common. At least three strikers were killed. |
| August 24, 1974 | Harlan County, KY | Coal mining | Strike | 1 | During the Brookside Strike, a company foreman shot and killed a picketing worker. |

=== Execution by the state ===
| Date | Location | Type of dispute | Workers executed by the State | Notes |
|---|---|---|---|---|
| June 21, 1877 – October 9, 1879 | Pennsylvania (Pottsville, Mauch Chunk, Bloomsburg, Sunbury) | coal mining strike | 20 | A 20% pay cut in December, 1874, led to a long strike that began on January 1, 1875,^{p. 51} and quickly turned violent. Several company bosses were killed. Bodies of militant miners were sometimes found in deserted mine shafts.^{p. 53} 20 workers (suspected Molly Maguires)^{pp. 5,10} were tried for murder and convicted largely on testimony of a Pinkerton spy.^{pp. 234–35} Three of the defendants confessed: Manus Cull, Francis McHugh, and Patrick Butler, as did Molly Maguire member "Powder Keg" Kerrigan. Their confessions and testimony corroborated that of Pinkerton agent McParlan. Historians have written that the murder charge against John Keyhoe, the subject of a later trial, remains dubious. Franklin B. Gowen, owner of the Philadelphia & Reading Railroad and the person who hired Pinkerton, had himself appointed special prosecutor.^{p. 54} The 20 men were hanged by the State of Pennsylvania. The Molly Maguire trials were a surrender of state sovereignty. A private corporation initiated the investigation through a private detective agency. A private police force arrested the alleged defenders, and private attorneys for the coal companies prosecuted them. The state provided only the courtroom and the gallows. ... Any objective study of the tenor of the times and the entire record must conclude that (the Mollies) ... did not have fair and impartial juries. They were, therefore, denied one of the fundamental rights that William Penn guaranteed to all of Pennsylvania's citizens. Following an investigation 100 years after his death, John Kehoe was posthumously pardoned by the governor, who wrote, "[I]t is impossible for us to imagine the plight of the 19th Century miners in Pennsylvania's anthracite region. ... We can be proud of the men known as the Molly Maguires", whom he praised as "these martyred men of labor".^{p. 284} |
| November 11, 1887 | Illinois | Strike | 4 hanged on Nov. 11, 1887 (Albert Parsons, August Spies, George Engel, Adolph Fischer) 1 suicide on Nov. 10, 1887 (Louis Lingg) | The day after the May 3, 1886, violence at the McCormick Harvesting Machine Company, up to 3000 people rallied at Haymarket Square in Chicago to protest police brutality. At about 10:30 pm an unknown person threw a bomb at the police as they acted to disperse the meeting. Immediately after the bomb blast, there was an exchange of gunshots. It is unclear who fired first. Historian Paul Avrich states that "nearly all sources agree that it was the police who opened fire", reloaded and then fired again, killing at least four and wounding as many as 70 people. In all, the bomb blast and ensuing gunfire by the police caused the deaths of seven police officers and at least four civilians. Most of the police deaths were from police gunfire. Eight labor activists and anarchists were charged with the bombing and were convicted of conspiracy. Evidence in the trial suggested one of the defendants may have built the bomb, but none of those on trial had thrown it, and only two of the eight were at Haymarket at the time. Ultimately, four labor union activists were hanged and one anarchist died by suicide. In 1893 Illinois Governor John Peter Altgeld found that "much of the evidence given in the trial was pure fabrication," and that the police had bribed and "terrorized ignorant men" or threatened witnesses "with torture if they refused to swear to anything desired." |
| November 19, 1915 | Utah | Organizing | Joe Hill | Joe Hill, IWW labor organizer and songwriter, was executed by firing squad by the State of Utah for the alleged murder of a grocer, despite worldwide protests and two attempts to intervene by President Woodrow Wilson. With the backing of the IWW, his conviction was appealed to the Utah Supreme Court. Citing dozens of alleged errors in procedure and fairness, attorney O.N. Hilton called Hill's case "utterly lacking in the essential fundamentals of proof." Recent research findings support "that the circumstantial case made against the man who ultimately was executed for the crime was nowhere near as convincing as the one that could and should have been made against (Frank Z.) Wilson," who was a serial criminal well known to police, who picked him up mere blocks from the murder, detained him and then let him go. |

== By vigilante, strikers, mob and hate group ==
| Date | Location | Industry | Type of dispute | Workers* killed by vigilante/mob | Notes |
|---|---|---|---|---|---|
| May 17, 1871 | Hyde Park section of Scranton, PA | Coal mining | Strike | 2 | Two strikers, Benjamin Davis and Daniel Jones, were shot and killed by a single bullet fired in Scranton during the 1871 Workingmen's Benevolent Association union coal strike. The shot was fired by a non-striking worker being escorted by state militia, who in April had been called in under the command of William W. Scranton. Eight thousand people attended the strikers' funeral. |
| March 14, 1877 | Chico, CA | Farming | Race | 4 | A group of white nativists organized as a "Laborers' Union" openly plotted assassination and arson before murdering four Chinese farmhands in a worker's cabin. Two survived to bear witness. Partly hate crime and partly labor conflict, this was one event in the attempted purge of Chinese immigrants from the U.S. west coast. |
| April 18, 1878 | Coal Creek, Indiana | Coal mining | Strike, race | 3 | A long-standing "armed truce" had stood between striking coal miners and imported non-union black replacement workers at Coal Creek for about a year. Since November 1877 some of the strikers had joined a local volunteer militia, armed by the State arsenal. A drunken argument left one black worker shot to death in a saloon, two more assassinated in the streets, and many turned out of their homes. |
| September 2, 1885 | Rock Springs, WY | Coal mining | Wage dispute, race | 28 or more | Rock Springs massacre: A riot between Chinese immigrant miners and white immigrant miners resulted from a labor dispute over the Union Pacific Coal Department's policy of preferentially hiring Chinese miners and paying them lower wages than white miners. Racial tensions were a factor in the massacre. When the rioting ended, at least 28 Chinese miners were dead and 15 were injured. |
| April 26, 1886 | Near Wyandotte, KS | Railroad | Strike | 2 | Great Southwest railroad strike of 1886: A sabotaged section of rail led to a fatal derailment, killing fireman William Carlisle and brakeman John Horton. |
| April 28, 1886 | St. Louis, Missouri | Railroad | Strike | 1 | Striker John Gibbons was fatally shot by a "non-union switchman and private watchman" acting in self-defense against his three assailants in St. Louis. Gibbons was among ten known casualties of the Great Southwest railroad strike of 1886. |
| September 2–12, 1889 | Leflore County, Mississippi | Farming | Organization | 6 or more | The organization of a local chapter of the Colored Farmers' National Alliance and Cooperative Union under a man named Oliver Cromwell in 1888 drew the armed opposition of white authorities, planters and retailers. In the resulting "Leflore County Massacre" six prominent "insurgents" were captured, accused of various crimes, and made subject to summary executions and lynchings. "A welter of reports (placed) the number of black dead between 30 and 100." |
| September 25, 1891 | Lee County, AR | Cotton | Strike | 15 | African-American cotton workers organized the Cotton pickers strike of 1891 for higher wages. Strikers killed two nonstriking cotton pickers on September 25, and killed a plantation manager three days later. In retaliation, a white mob killed 12 strikers, most of them by lynching. |
| March 12, 1895 | New Orleans, LA | Longshoremen | Labor competition | 6 | Six non-union black longshoremen were shot and killed in the 1895 New Orleans dockworkers riot as they loaded an ocean-going cotton vessel, attacked by a mob of union white competitors. |
| April 10, 1899 | Pana, IL | Coal mining | Strike | about 7 | In the Pana riot, one of the incidents of the southern Illinois coal wars, three-way conflict with a racial character among local white miners, newly settled unionized black miners, and non-union black miners resulted in an estimated seven killed and 28 more wounded. |
| September 17, 1899 | Carterville, IL | Coal mining | Strike | 5 | In the last of the deadly incidents in the southern Illinois coal wars, five black strikebreakers died in a gunfight while being chased by a crowd of striking white miners. Government troops were again summoned following the killings. |
| 1902 | Hazleton, PA | Coal mining | Strike | 14 | 14 non-union workers killed, 42 badly injured, at anthracite strike near Hazleton, PA |
| October 17, 1905 | Newark, Ohio | Metal workers | Strike | 3 | Amid a string of assaults and injuries, three men were killed in separate incidents during a strike of metal polishers against the Wehrle Stove Company. Striker Michael Goodwin, a union guard, was shot to death on October 17. Non-union worker Charles Higgins was killed on November 11 by a striker. And non-union polisher Homer Loar was shot and killed on December 21 by a striking worker. |
| 1910 | Tampa, FL | Cigar mfg. | Organizing | 5 | Five labor organizers were lynched in Tampa during 1910. The Committee for the Defense of Civil Rights in Tampa stated, "The Tampa cigar bosses carry on a constant campaign to prevent the organization of cigar makers unions."^{p. 8} |
| January 9–13, 1911 | Somerset, KY | Railroad | Racial labor rules | 9 | White firemen of the Cincinnati, New Orleans and Texas Pacific Railway (part of the Queen and Crescent Route) struck on January 9, 1911, when the company refused their demand that their black counterparts be fired within 90 days. Trains continued to run, with black firemen on their crews, in the vicinity of Kings Mountain, Kentucky, Somerset, Kentucky, and Oakdale, Tennessee, in terrain well-suited for sniper attacks. At least eleven people were killed by sharpshooters within four days, nine of them black railroad employees, and two detectives. |
| October 3, 1911, through January 25, 1912 | Illinois, California, Utah, Mississippi | Railroad | Strike | 11 | Five of the twelve known casualties of the Illinois Central shopmen's strike of 1911 were strikers: Robert Mitchell, Cairo Illinois, October 3; Lem Haley, McComb Mississippi, October 4; J.S. Coldereau, Bakersfield California, November 25, 1911; John G. Hayden, Salt Lake City, December 5; and Ed Lefevre, Mojave California, January 25. Five replacement workers and one non-striking worker were also killed. |
| August 3, 1913 | Wheatland, CA | Agriculture | Strike | 2 | Wheatland Hop Riot: Fighting broke out when sheriff's deputies attempted to arrest IWW leader Richie "Blackie" Ford as he addressed striking field workers at the Durst Ranch. Four people died, including two workers, the local district attorney and a deputy. Despite the lack of evidence against them, Ford and another strike leader were found guilty of murder. |
| December 7, 1913 | Painesdale, MI | Copper mining | Strike | 3 | Dally-Jane murders: Part of the Copper Country Strike of 1913–1914. Three striking miners (two Finnish brothers named Huhta and an Austrian) fired random rifle shots from 50 yards into the boarding house of Thomas Dally on Baltic Street, which housed replacement miners. The gunshots killed Dally and two English brothers, William Arthur Jane and Thomas Henry Jane. The attached house also received fire, injuring 13-year-old Mary Nicholson. |
| December 24, 1913 | Red Jacket, MI | Copper mining | Strike | 11 (plus 62 children) | Italian Hall disaster: As the Copper Country strike of 1913–1914 dragged on into the cold of December, the hatred on both sides grew.^{p. 326} Anna Klobuchar Clemenc and the Women's Auxiliary of the Western Federation of Miners organized a Christmas-Eve party for strikers and their families. The hall was packed with 400 to 500 people when someone shouted "fire". There was no fire, but 73 people, 62 of them children, were crushed to death trying to escape. |
| August 1, 1917 | Butte, MT | Copper mining | Organizing | 1 | IWW organizer Frank Little was lynched by six masked men. 10,000 workers lined the route of his funeral procession. Years later writer Dashiell Hammett would recall his early days as a Pinkerton detective agency operative and recount how a mine company representative offered him $5,000 to kill Little. |
| September 11, 1919 | Boston, MA | Police | Strike | 1 | At least one of the nine people killed in riots when striking police clashed with state guardsman was a patrolman, Richard D. Reemts. During an altercation in which he and an associate disarmed two volunteer replacement officers, another non-striking officer approached, prompting Reemts to flee into the path of a startled storekeeper, who shot Reemts for fear of being attacked. |
| September 30, 1919 | Elaine, AR | Agriculture | Organizing, race | about 100 | African-American farmers met to establish the Progressive Farmers and Household Union of America to fight for better pay and higher cotton prices. They were shot at by a group of whites and returned the fire. News of the confrontation spread and the Elaine massacre ensued, leaving at least 100 blacks dead. |
| November 11, 1919 | Centralia, WA | Lumber | Organizing | 1 | Centralia Massacre: Two American Legion members in an Armistice Day parade were shot dead by IWW members firing rifles, after which the unarmed Legionaires attempted to force their way into the IWW hall. Two more were shot dead by members of the IWW, after which an IWW organizer named Wesley Everest was lynched by vigilantes. |
| November 22, 1919 | Bogalusa, LA | Lumber | Organizing | 4 | Bogalusa sawmill killings: Gunmen hired by the Great Southern Lumber Company converged on the organizing office of the International Union of Timber Workers and without warning began to shoot. Lem Williams was shot down at the front door, and J.P. Bouchillon and Thomas Gaines were then killed as each appeared at the doorway. Stanley O'Rourke attempted to leave by the back door where he was shot while coming out with his hands above his head. |
| August 5, 1920 | Denver, CO | Streetcar | Strike | 7 | Denver streetcar strike of 1920: Seven workers were killed and 80 others wounded over two nights of violent riots triggered by a streetcar strike. |
| Jan–Feb, 1922 | Oklahoma City, OK and Fort Worth TX | Meatpacking | Strike | 2 | Two black strikebreaking meat packers were lynched during the Amalgamated Meat Cutters strike of 1921–22: Jake Brooks in Oklahoma City on January 14, 1922, and an unnamed injured black meatpacker, kidnapped by the Klan from a hospital and lynched in February. |
| June 22, 1922 | Herrin, IL | Coal mining | Strike | 22 | Herrin Massacre: Several hundred armed UMWA strikers laid siege to a nonunion mine. After an afternoon of gunfire by both sides, three of the besieging strikers were dead or mortally wounded. The next morning, the approximately 50 strikebreakers agreed to surrender their arms in exchange for a guarantee of safe passage out of the county. After the disarmed strikebreakers left the mine, 19 were killed by the strikers in various ways; some were killed in the town cemetery, in front of a crowd of about 1,000 cheering townspeople. Some were tied up and repeatedly shot at close range; some had their throats slit. |
| January 16, 1923 | Harrison, AR | Railroad | Strike | 1 | The "Harrison Railroad Riot": striking railroad worker Ed C. Gregor was jailed for discharging a shotgun in the air to fend off a mob, then kidnapped from jail and lynched on a railroad bridge. Other fellow AFL members were taken from their homes and flogged. The Klan had allied with townspeople, under economic pressure from the strike, to combat the strikers and their campaign of railroad bridge arson. |
| September 14, 1929 | Gastonia, NC | Textile | Strike | 1 | Textile mill striker and songwriter Ella May Wiggins, 29, a mother of five, was killed when local vigilantes forced the pickup truck in which she was riding off the road and began shooting. |
| March 6, 1930 | Philadelphia, PA | Garment | Strike | 1 | One man, Carl Mackley, was shot to death and three others were wounded seriously in a battle between employees of the H. C. Aberle hosiery mills and members of the American Federation of Full Fashioned Hosiery Workers and their sympathizers. |
| February 24, 1931 | Stroudsburg, PA | Textile | Strike | 1 | Twenty-year-old striking hosiery mill worker Alberta Bachman was shot and killed, and two others wounded, by a former striker who had returned to work. The former striker shot into a car he believed was going to throw rocks at his house. Bachman was a member of the American Federation of Full Fashioned Hosiery Workers, striking Mammoth Mills. |
| July 16, 1931 | Camp Hill, Alabama | Cotton workers | strike | 1 | Eight hundred black workers associated with the newly founded Croppers and Farm Workers Union struck in July for cash wages and a nine-month school year for tenant children, among other demands. On the 15th a vigilante anti-union white lynch mob descended on SCU meetings, but were held off by strike leader Ralph Gray. The following day a gun battle between Gray and the local sheriff left both wounded. Later a white mob assassinated Gray in his bed, burned down his house, and deposited his body on the grounds of the county courthouse. By one report four other black union members were lynched. Workers immediately reorganized as the Share Croppers Union. |
| October 19, 1933 | Springfield, IL | Coal mining | Strike | 1 | While on strike with Progressive Miners of America and in a protest march at the state capitol, Taylorville coal miner Melville Staples was shot once in the chest and died within 15 minutes. The shooter was later identified as a local United Mine Workers official. |
| December 22, 1933, and March 15, 1934 | Hudson, MI | Auto | Organizing | 2 | Two auto unionists were killed by the Black Legion: George Marchuk of the Auto Workers Union, and John Bielak of the Hudson Motor Local of the AFL, both Communist labor activists, found shot to death three months apart. |
| April 1934 | Lakeland, FL | Citrus | Organizing | 1 | Frank Norman, a citrus workers union organizer, was abducted by Klansmen, and never seen or heard from again.^{p. 9} |
| August 20, 1934 | Portland, Oregon | Longshoremen | Strike | 1 | James Connor, a 22-year-old college student and newlywed working as a replacement worker on his vacation, was shot and killed in an altercation with striking longshoremen. This was one of a string of violent incidents, including visiting Senator Robert F. Wagner coming under fire. A second replacement worker named R.A. Griffin was also wounded in the head. |
| June 19, 1935 | Union, South Carolina | Textile | Strike | 2 | During a United Textile Workers of America strike against Monarch Mills, a lunchtime fight at the mill gate became a riot. Overseer A.L. Stutts was shot and killed by Constable W.B. Franklin, who was then shot and killed by a third man. |
| September 2, 1935 | Pelzer, SC | Textile | Strike | 1 | As a non-striking worker tried to drive a car through a picket line, gunfire between strikers and non-strikers broke out. Laura Gertrude Kelly, standing among a group of workers at a distance outside the plant gate, was killed. |
| November 30, 1935 | Tampa, FL | Cigar mfg. | Organizing | 1 | In the 1930s, the Ku Klux Klan harassed and intimidated union leaders. On November 30, 1935, Tampa police raided an organizational meeting of "Modern Democrats" in a private home without a warrant. Joseph A. Shoemaker and five other organizers were taken to a Tampa police station. Five policemen then turned three of them over to a mob of Klansmen. Shoemaker died nine days later after he was stripped, flogged with tire chains, clubbed on the head, burned with a hot poker in the genitals, covered in boiling tar and feathers and paralyzed on one side. The cigar industry moguls of Tampa had actively opposed Shoemaker, had close ties to the police and posted bail for the arrested policemen. "A thorough investigation revealed that the murder resulted from a collaboration between Tampa Chief of Police R. G. Tittsworth and (the) local Klan." |
| December 9 and 14, 1936 | Galveston and Houston, TX | Shipping | Strike | 2 | Two strikers were killed in the 1936 Gulf Coast maritime workers' strike: Johnny Kane, who was shot on December 4 by a union official, and who died on December 15, and an Alaskan striker named Peter Banfield, a tanker seaman fatally stabbed in a fight in Galveston on December 9. |
| December 11, 1936 | Chester, PA | Shipbuilding | Strike | 1 | At Sun Shipbuilding & Drydock Co. in Chester, Pennsylvania, one striker named John Young was killed, another (Peter Martain) was not expected to live, and 40 were injured, in battles between strikers and non-strikers in fighting that involved thrown rocks and bricks. |
| February 10, 1938 | Chicago, IL | Hotel | Strike | 1 | Lloyd Rourke was beaten so severely when he attempted to deliver laundry to the Del Prado Hotel, that he died two days later. Police suspected striking hotel workers, but no arrests were made. |
| November 3, 1979 | Greensboro, NC | Textile | Organizing | 5 | Five labor organizers were killed at the Greensboro Massacre, as workers were attempting to organize across racial lines at various textile mills in the area. A rally to protest recruitment at the mills by the Ku Klux Klan and Nazis turned violent, resulting in the deaths of the organizers. |

* includes labor organizers

== See also ==
- Anti-union violence in the United States
- List of incidents of civil unrest in the United States
- List of strikes
- Union violence in the United States
