= Carterville Mine Riot =

Illinois coal wars event, 1899

- Date: September 17, 1899
- Location: Carterville, Illinois, United States

Parties
White residents of Carterville, Illinois (striking coal miners), United Mine Workers	African-American residents of Dewmaine, Illinois (strikebreakers)

Casualties and losses
0 killed 0 wounded	5 killed 2 wounded

The Carterville Mine Riot was part of the turn-of-the-century Illinois coal wars in the United States. The national United Mine Workers of America coal strike of 1897 was officially settled for Illinois District 12 in January 1898, with the vast majority of operators accepting the union terms: thirty-six to forty cents per ton (depending on the county), an 8-hour day, and union recognition. However, several mine owners in Carterville, Virden, and Pana, refused or abrogated. They attempted to run with African-American strikebreakers from Alabama and Tennessee. At the same time, lynching and racial exclusion were increasingly practiced by local white mining communities. Racial segregation was enforced within and among UMWA-organized coal mines.

== Background ==
There had already been the Virden Riot (Oct 12, 1898) and the Pana Riot (Apr 10, 1899). Between these, however there occurred a relatively rare event in Illinois: the lynching of an African-American named F. W. Stewart. A Chicago newspaper narrated “Toluca is a mining town on the Santa Fe Road, a place of recent rapid growth, with a mixed population of turbulent disposition. There are many foreigners and some negroes. Against the latter there has always been considerable antipathy, which has been heightened of late by the troubles at Pana and Virden. The white miners grew more bitter against the colored men as they heard how the negroes were being imported from the South, and many colored men were forced to leave town because feeling was running so high. Among those who persisted in staying, however, was F.W. Stewart, a man of bad character and the victim of mob law today.” Stewart was probably not even a coal miner, and this event took place far away from any picket line, or strikebreaking activity.

== Precursor ==
In Carterville, Illinois 60 miles north of Cairo, at the southern tip of the state, mine owner Samuel Brush imported African-American strikebreakers from Sweetwater, Tennessee. They arrived May 20, 1898 in the new all-black company camp named Dewmaine, next to all-white Carterville. Some white miners worked as strikebreakers too, and production continued for over a year. In March 1899, Brush unilaterally instituted an 8-hour day and raised the tonnage rate 1.5 cents above union scale for his non-union employees, but would not recognize the UMWA. The union organized about half of his men (the whites and some blacks), and called a strike. After this partial walkout of his miners, Brush escalated. He proceeded to import 40 of the Birmingham, Alabama strikebreakers, with their families, that had just been ejected from Pana in a white riot. On June 30, the train from Pana, carrying Brush, the strikebreakers, and guards, stopped at Lauder (near Carterville). UMWA leaders and strikers, some white and some black, ordered the conductor not to continue. He refused, and they opened fire from the platform and from cover in a nearby field. Anna Karr, wife of one of the strikebreakers, was killed and 20 others on the train were injured. That night, several hundred union miners surrounded the Brush mine and began shooting. Strikebreakers emerged and opened fire on "union city", a cluster of houses built by the union for blacks who were loyal to the union (since they were not allowed in Carterville). Residents fled and the houses were burned. No fatalities resulted from these latest fights. Troops were called in, and arrived July 2. Brush brought in two more loads of strikebreakers and production resumed. Nine men were accused of killing Anna Karr, but none were convicted at trial. This was a precursor to the riot of September 17.

== The Riot ==
Troops were removed from the area on September 11. On September 15, several blacks tried to enter Carterville, but were driven back by white miners. On September 17, a party of 13 African-Americans, some armed, tried to walk from the mine to the Carterville train station on personal business. They were met at the station by 30 armed whites, and, according to contemporary accounts, this is when the shooting began. Shots were fired and some blacks scattered through the streets and others retreated down the tracks toward home. The latter were pursued by the white miners. "One of the black men fired at their pursuers, and the miners responded by returning fire. Five of the blacks died instantly, and several others were injured. When the survivors made it back to the African-American community, nearly 200 blacks stormed the mine’s storehouse, where there were guns, but Brush’s son prevented them from arming themselves."

== Aftermath ==
Troops were called back in. Twelve whites were charged with murder for the riot, none convicted. Production at the mine continued with the strikebreakers working until 1906, when Samuel Brush sold out to the Madison Coal Company. The new owner recognized the UMWA and the African-American miners became members. Production resumed again. By this time, the black Dewmaine camp had actually become a town with a post office, school, and a clinic with two doctors. A normal, if not prosperous, culture was established, as in any small white coal-town. The death knell for Dewmaine came in 1923, however, when Madison Coal closed its mine.

== Legacy ==
Carterville, in this chapter of the Illinois Coal Wars, had a very different racial legacy, when compared to Virden and Pana. African-American coal miners suffered losses, but were not expelled for good, as in those conflicts. They were able to establish themselves, for twenty-four years, in a Northern industrial environment, with steady employment, and even union representation. Alternative research has re-analyzed black strikebreaking as a racial survival strategy designed to deal with the dominant society, rather than as a breach of class solidarity at a critical point during a strike.
