= Agnes Burns Wieck =

American labor organizer

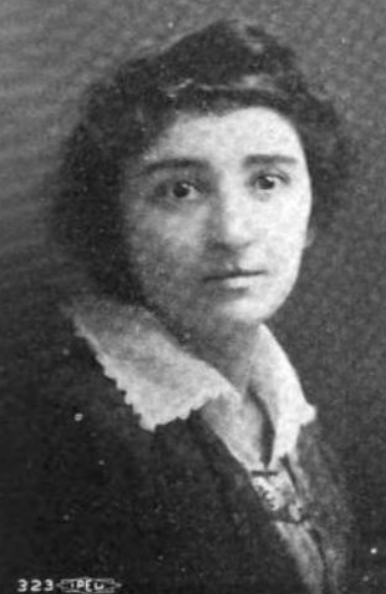
- Agnes Burns (later Wieck), from a 1916 publication
- Born: Agnes Burns; January 4, 1892; Sandoval, Illinois
- Died: October 22, 1966 (aged 74)
- Occupations: Labor activist, journalist, editor
- Children: David Wieck

Agnes Burns Wieck (January 4, 1892 – October 22, 1966) was an American labor activist and journalist, described as "a Coal Field 'Hell Raiser'".

== Early life ==
Agnes Burns was born in Sandoval, Illinois. Her parents were both born in Kentucky; her father, Patrick Burns, was a coal miner active in union organizing. She remembered accompanying her mother to ask farmers for food during an 1897 bituminous coal strike. She trained as a teacher and attended a course on labor organizing at the University of Chicago, on a scholarship from the National Women's Trade Union League.

== Career ==
Wieck was a teacher for five years as a young woman. She participated in strikes by women workers in Boston and Philadelphia. From 1924 to 1930 Wieck wrote for The Illinois Miner, and was its women's page editor. In 1928, she actively supported the presidential campaign of Al Smith.

During the Illinois Coal Wars, Wieck was founder and first president of the short-lived Illinois Women's Auxiliary of the Progressive Miners of America (PMA) in 1932. She led a January 1933 march to the Illinois state capitol by the Illinois Women's Auxiliary, including 54 recent widows and orphans from the 1932 mine disaster at Moweaqua; she presented a petition to the governor. In August 1933 she was "dragged", "manhandled", arrested and jailed, after a PMA meeting was attacked by the United Mine Workers and the county sheriff's department. She worked with Thyra J. Edwards to include Black women in the auxiliary's work. She was compared to Mother Jones, and a 1933 headline described her as a "Coal Field 'Hell Raiser'". In 1934 she represented Illinois coal field women at a women's conference of the International League against War and Fascism in Paris.

Wieck moved to New York in 1934 with her husband and son. She was editor of The Woman Today. She also wrote about racism in mining country for The New Republic. During World War II, she worked to get her son and other imprisoned conscientious objectors amnesty and better prison conditions.

== Publications ==
- "At the League's Training School" (1916)
- "Ku Kluxing in the Miners' Country" (1924)
- "Our Children's Ideals and the Splendid Program of the Pioneer Youth Movement" (1924)
- "The British Strike" (1926)
- "A Blind Man's Plea" (1928, about Paul Farthing)
- "Mrs. Wieck Interviews Mrs. Brechnitz--or Trys to" (1929)

== Personal life and legacy ==
Agnes Burns married labor activist Edward A. Wieck in 1921. Their son was philosophy professor and activist David Wieck. She died in 1966, aged 74 years. Her papers are held in the Reuther Library at Wayne State University. In 1985, she was inducted posthumously into the Illinois Labor History Society's Hall of Honor. Her son wrote a biography, Woman from Spillertown: A Memoir of Agnes Burns Wieck (1991), published by Southern Illinois University Press. A 2015 radio documentary about Wieck aired on public radio stations in Illinois.
