= Wiek =

Wiek may refer to:

- the old German name for Lääne County, Estonia
- a common German dialect name for bays on the coast of Pomerania
- Wiek, Rügen, a municipality on the island of Rügen, Germany
- WIEK-LD, a defunct low-power television station (channel 23) formerly licensed to serve Midland, Michigan, United States

== See also ==
- Wieck (disambiguation)
- Wyk (disambiguation)
- Wick (disambiguation)
