= Battle of the Viaduct =

Event that took place on July 25, 1877, in Chicago

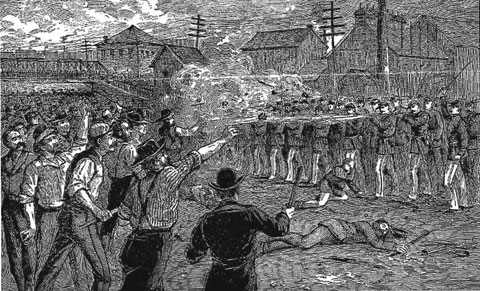
Battle of the Viaduct

The Battle of the Viaduct was an event that took place on July 25, 1877, in Chicago due to a much larger event, the Great Railroad Strike of 1877. The strike began on July 14, 1877, in West Virginia.

== The battle ==
By Wednesday, July 25, it was clear that authorities would not refrain from challenging crowds. The police attempted to disperse crowds wherever they appeared, but the bands of people disappeared and reappeared unpredictably, making order difficult to maintain. A mob numbering about ten thousand men, women, and children had gathered at the Halsted Street viaduct; a body of police was sent to the viaduct with orders to disperse the crowd. At the sight of the police, the crowd broke and fled to the other side of the viaduct, with police pursuing them and firing at them as they ran.

The crowd then turned around and charged the police. The crowd threw stones, some shot their pistols, and other various objects were thrown at the police. At the same time, the police discharged their weapons at the mob for a period of half an hour. When the police ran low on ammunition, their sergeant gave orders to fire off all their remaining ammunition and at the same time withdraw across the viaduct back towards the police station. The crowd, still just as big as before and now even angrier, pursued the police.

The police found themselves trapped at the south side of the street because the bridge was raised. They were saved when an unidentified boy lowered the bridge, allowing the police to escape and the cavalry to come to their rescue. The cavalry was followed by several large wagons filled with reinforcements. Here, the crowd once again turned around and retreated to the other side of the bridge while being fired upon by the police and beaten by their clubs. Many reporters were at the scene of the conflict and they reported the typical clashes of that day consisted of guerrilla warfare. When cavalry or police approached, a crowd would part and then close behind it while throwing stones and pieces of wood and coal.

Rumors of fresh outbreaks in the city continued and more and more government troops kept arriving. These troops stationed themselves at various points of the city believed to be susceptible to violent uprisings whilst police patrolled the city and arrested many. The rioters did not dare gather in great numbers like they had at the Halsted Street viaduct, but small crowds kept springing up, even though they continued to be dispersed swiftly.

== Aftermath ==
July 26 passed with no further violence. The rioters remained agitated and restless but avoided further conflict. Many places remained closed until the following week and by then the strike had lost its momentum as crowds ceased to gather. "Thirty workers died at the Viaduct, 100 were wounded, and at least thirteen cops were injured. The New York Times reported rocks flying from workers' hands, police shooting guns and swinging clubs, and 'no less than 10,000 men present … they were bent on violence and hesitated at nothing.'"

== See also ==
- List of worker deaths in United States labor disputes
