= Battle of Virden =

Labor union and racial conflict in Illinois, 1898

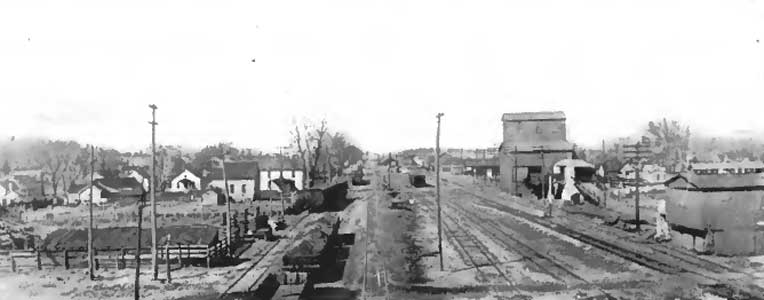
- Railroad tracks of Virden, Illinois, c. 1900.
- Date: October 12, 1898
- Location: Virden, Illinois, United States

Parties
Striking coal miners United Mine Workers	Chicago-Virden Coal Co. aided by Thiel Detective Service Company and Chicago ex-policemen

Casualties and losses
8 killed 30 wounded	5 killed 5 wounded

The Battle of Virden, also known as the Virden Mine Riot and Virden Massacre, was a labor union conflict and a racial conflict in central Illinois that occurred on October 12, 1898. After a United Mine Workers of America local struck a mine in Virden, Illinois, the Chicago-Virden Coal Company hired armed detectives or security guards to accompany African-American strikebreakers to start production again. An armed conflict broke out when the train carrying these men arrived at Virden. Strikers were also armed: a total of five detective/security guards and eight striking mine workers were killed, with five guards and more than thirty miners wounded. In addition, at least one black strikebreaker on the train was wounded. The engineer was shot in the arm. This was one of several fatal conflicts in the area at the turn of the century that reflected both labor union tension and racial violence. Virden, at this point, became a sundown town, and most black miners were expelled from Macoupin County.

== History ==
After the Illinois District of the UMWA settled with almost every operator, the Chicago-Virden Coal Company and a few others abrogated, and recruited African-American miners as strikebreakers. On September 24, a trainload of potential strikebreaking African-American miners pulled into Virden on the Chicago & Alton Railroad (C&A RR, multiple tracks to the west, right in the photograph). That train did not stop, but continued north to Springfield, Illinois without incident.

On October 12, 1898, another northbound train pulled into Virden, loaded with about over 100 African-American potential strikebreakers, along with their wives and children. The train had brought the recruited workers from Birmingham, Alabama via East St. Louis. There it had taken on detectives from the Thiel Detective Service Company, who were armed with Winchester rifles and orders to protect the strikebreakers. It stopped on the C&A RR tracks just outside the minehead stockade. As the strikers attempted to surrounded the train, shooting from all sides commenced. The strikebreakers and families were unarmed, and sheltered under the seats, as the windows of the five-car train were blown out.

There were dead and wounded on both sides. Eight UMWA miners were killed, and 30 wounded; four Thiel guards were killed and five wounded. Some black strikebreakers on the train were also wounded but all casualties were not recorded. After twenty minutes of firing on both sides, the train's engineer pulled away from the minehead, keeping the strikebreakers in their cars, and continued northward to Springfield, Illinois. There, the injured and dead were taken off the train. The Alabamians were promised care and transportation by UMWA officials, and were persuaded to come to the union hall. The next day, October 13, the union abruptly announced it would not protect or care for the African Americans beyond six o’clock that evening. A pair of black miners tried to run from the union hall to the train station, but were caught by the white miners and badly beaten. A mob gathered at the union hall threatening to lynch the strikebreakers but Mayor Loren Wheeler of Springfield calmed them down and arranged to send the Birmingham miners to St Louis on the next train. There, they were abandoned without money, food, or warm clothes.

=== Illinois governor sends the National Guard ===
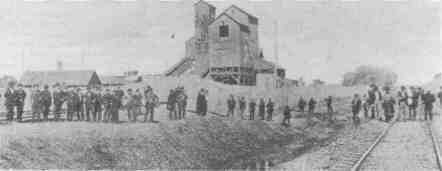
Battle of Virden Illinois, 1898

Governor Tanner ordered the Illinois National Guard to prevent any more strikebreakers from arriving in the state. He said that if another rail car carried strikebreakers into the state, he would "shoot it to pieces with Gatling guns." In compliance to Tanner's orders, the captain in charge of the Illinois Guard at Pana promised: "If any negros are brought into Pana while I am in charge, and if they refuse orders to retreat when ordered to do so, I will order my men to fire. If I lose every man under my command no negros shall land at Pana."

The governor admitted that he had no legal authority for his action to prevent strikebreakers, but said that he was doing the will of the people. The mine owners capitulated in mid-November and accepted the UMWA unionization of the Virden coal mines. The union and the mine owners agreed to segregate the Virden mines. Virden enforced segregation as a sundown town for decades thereafter. State records show that of 3,123 miners in Macoupin County (where Virden is located) in 1908, only one African-American miner was left.

A monument in the Virden town square commemorates the coal strike of 1898 and the battle of October 12 that was its bitter end. The monument contains a large bronze bas-relief that includes the names of those killed in the battle, and a copy of a recruiting handbill distributed by the Chicago-Virden Company in Birmingham, Alabama, to recruit the Negro miners. The body of the bas-relief is made of symbolic representations of the Chicago & Alton tracks and the assault on the strikers. The guards are shown pointing their Winchesters at the strikers and their families. Atop the bas-relief is a bronze portrait of Mary Harris Jones ("Mother Jones"). Mother Jones is buried in the Union Miners Cemetery in nearby Mount Olive, Illinois, alongside miners who died in the October 1898 conflict. Traditional commemorations of the Battle of Virden have been questioned, however, and the issue of reparations has been raised.

== Related conflicts ==
The UMWA and coal mine owners were involved in similar conflicts in two other towns where the owners hired guards and strikebreakers: the Pana Massacre in Pana, Illinois on April 10, 1899 and in Carterville, Illinois on September 17, 1899.

Both before and after the events at Virden, Governor John Riley Tanner ordered the state militia to Pana to keep the peace, as the miners tried to unionize the mine. The militia withdrew from Pana in March, and on April 10, 1899, white strikers killed two of their own along with five African-American strikebreakers. At least 15 people were wounded. .

At Lauder (now Cambria, Illinois), a group of African-American miners traveling by train from Pana were attacked by organized strikers on June 30, 1899. The wife of a strikebreaker, Anna Karr, was shot and killed, and about twenty other persons wounded. At Carterville on September 17, union miners rioted against black strikebreakers, and five non-union miners were killed. Local juries acquitted all those accused in those attacks.

A month after the Virden conflict, an African-American, F. W. Stewart, was lynched at Lacon, Illinois by organized miners for refusing to honor the town of Toluca's new sundown rule. There was no active strike or strikebreaking at Toluca.

== See also ==
- Murder of workers in labor disputes in the United States
- List of battles fought in Illinois
- List of incidents of civil unrest in the United States
- List of homicides in Illinois
