= Illinois coal wars =

1898–1900 labor disputes and racial conflict in Illinois, United States

Illinois Coal Wars
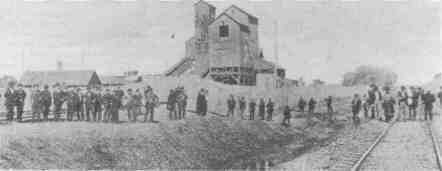
- Miners gathering at the railroad tracks in Virden on October 12, 1898.
- Date: 1898–1900
- Location: Illinois, United States
- Deaths: approximately 24

The Illinois coal wars, also known as the Illinois mine wars and by several other names, were a series of labor disputes between 1898 and 1900 in the coal mining industry of central and southern Illinois.

The disputes began when coal miners employed by the Chicago–Virden Coal Company went on strike and company management brought in strikebreakers by train to bypass them. The strike was also characterized by racial violence and class conflict between black and white coal miners, most notably during the Battle of Virden on October 12, 1898, and the Pana massacre on April 10, 1899.

In 1898, a coal miners' strike began in Virden after the Chicago–Virden Coal Company refused to pay their miners union-scale wages. The strike ended with six security guards and seven miners killed, and over 30 others were injured. The company finally granted the wage increase a month after the strike began. The strike in Virden is also credited with winning an 8-hour work day for hourly mine workers, and a memorial in the town square commemorates the battle.

The same conditions and organizations were also involved in similar conflicts in two other southern Illinois towns: in Lauder (now Cambria, Illinois) on June 30, 1899, and in Carterville on September 17. At Lauder a group of African-American miners traveling by train from Pana were attacked. One woman, Anna Karr, was killed and about twenty others wounded. At Carterville, five more non-union African-American miners were killed during rioting. Local juries acquitted all defendants accused in those attacks.

After the massacre, the mine operators temporarily shut down all of Pana's mines in late June to demonstrate good faith in arbitration, and also because of their fear of violence. Because of the low wages paid by the operators, the black community was left impoverished. Many of them spent their money to get to Weir, Kansas, where they were recruited to break up another mining strike.

== Context ==
Just southwest of Springfield, Illinois, in 1852, the new town of Virden was founded and grew quickly, with various businesses, churches, a doctor and the towns' first school being established. The completion of the Chicago and Alton Railroad helped prompt the establishment of Virden. In January 1855, areas around Virden and Virden itself endured one of the most disastrous snowstorms in the area's history. Train cars became stuck on the railroads, and passenger cars could not be unloaded.

In 1869 the first coal shaft was mined near the town, and over the next few decades Virden grew to support 21 different coal mines. With so many mines being held up by such a small, fairly new town, mine workers were overworked and underpaid. By 1897, labor conditions resulted in the nationwide United Mine Workers (UMW) coal strike, where an agreement was made in January 1898 by all Illinois coal companies and the districts of UMW that there was going to be a new 40-cent per ton rate. Soon after, the Chicago–Virden Coal Company repealed the agreement and went down to the South, mainly Birmingham, Alabama, to bring back African-American strikebreakers to work in the mines, lowering the available hours for the strikers.

== Riot ==
After the Chicago–Virden Coal Company repealed the agreement, European immigrants in the striking labor unions felt threatened by the African-American miners coming in. Near the end of September 1868, as one train car came in to Virden full of workers, a stockade was built near the entrance of the mine and around 300 armed workers emerged to meet the train, full of strikebreakers, at its intended destination, but the train sped past without stopping and continued onto Springfield. About three weeks later, the number of strikers had increased to almost 2,000 and the company owner tried again to bring in another train. On October 12, 1898, the train arrived in Virden, but white strikers shot at it, resulting in it stopping at the stockade. A pitched battle then broke out between the white union workers, guards, and a few black Birmingham workers. The fight lasted around ten minutes; 7 striking miners and 5 guards were killed in the riot, and 30 others were injured, one of which was a Birmingham worker. The next day, the union said that they would not take care of the African-American workers, so a pair of people who ran away were stopped by white workers and severely beaten. A mob gathered at the mayor's office and threatened to begin lynching all the strikebreakers. Instead, Mayor Loren Wheeler sent all of the Birmingham workers on a train to St. Louis.

State troops were called into the town and surrounding areas. Charges were filed against some strikers and owners, but no one was convicted. The coal company also finally accepted the demands of the workers and re-opened the mines as quickly as they could.

== Later conflicts ==
In the 1920s, under the guidance of John L. Lewis, the United Mine Workers of America witnessed a significant shift in their approach towards local coal companies in an effort to consolidate and enhance the union's authority. This collaboration came at the expense of Illinois locals and their rank-and-file members. The UMWA pursued a strategy that involved undermining labor-friendly contract provisions, including job-sharing arrangements that had long been regarded as customary. The UMWA even went as far as expelling 24 locals to get rid of any challenge to its authority. This conflict came into full force in the years 1932–1936, when the UMWA tried to force a contract on the Illinois miners who were already on strike, ignoring the concerns and problems brought by the Great Depression. With the Great Depression, Illinois UMWA negotiators were forced to accept a pay cut for miners, dropping it from $6.10 a day to $5. The laborers eventually managed to defeat this cut, forcing Lewis to schedule another vote in August, but it was passed the second time. The laborers were furious, holding strikes and demonstrations and organizing the Progressive Miners of America (PMA) to try and fight back for the rights of regular laborers.

This built-up anger quickly turned violent with multiple bombings, shootings, and fights all within a two-week period in February 1933. Many of the attacks directly attempted to harm or kill UMWA miners or officials, organized by PMA workers. Federal and local authorities sided with the UMWA and mine operators, and as the violence died down many PMA miners started to return to the mines, and those who came back sooner were less likely to lose their jobs and be flagged by authorities. Many PMA workers were indicted because of their connection to the violence, including 41 federal indictments issued in connection with 23 railroad bombings, six attempted bombings, and one railroad bridge burning which occurred between December 17, 1932 and August 8, 1935. This was the first time in U.S. history that indictments were returned on the federal anti-racketeering act against a labor union. After President Franklin Roosevelt issued $10,000 fines to each convicted miner, many felt that the spirit of the PMA was broken, and that the authority of the UMWA had returned.

== See also ==
- Murder of workers in labor disputes in the United States
- Herrin Massacre
- Coal Wars
- Copper Country strike of 1913–1914
- Cripple Creek miners' strike of 1894
- West Virginia coal wars
- Colorado Labor Wars
- Harlan County War
- Molly Maguires
- Battle of Blair Mountain
- Coal strike of 1902
