= Bogalusa sawmill killings =

Mass racial attack in Bogalusa, Louisiana in 1919

Bogalusa saw mill killings
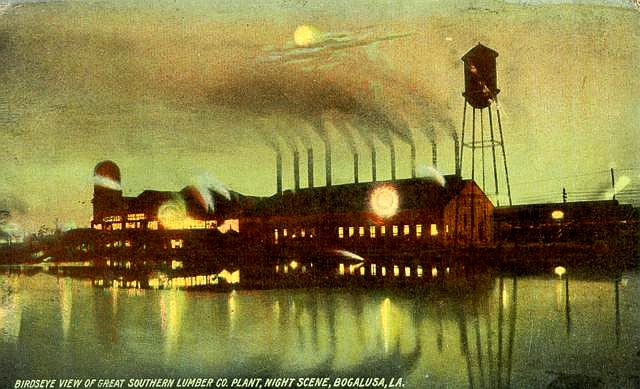
- Night time shot of the Great Southern Lumber Company at Bogalusa
- Date: November 22, 1919
- Location: Bogalusa, Louisiana, United States; 30°46′50″N 89°51′50″W
- Methods: Strikes, protests, demonstrations, union organization
- Result: Severe setback to black labor organizing

Parties
Sawmill workers; American Federation of Labor	White paramilitary forces; Self-Preservation and Loyalty League (SPLL)

Lead figures
Sol Dacus; Lum William	William H. Sullivan

Casualties and losses
Deaths: 6	Injured: 1
- Location within Louisiana Location within the United States

The Bogalusa saw mill killings were a series of racially motivated attacks that occurred on November 22, 1919, resulting in the deaths of four labor organizers. These attacks took place in Bogalusa, Louisiana, United States, and were orchestrated by the white paramilitary group known as the Self-Preservation and Loyalty League (SPLL). The SPLL received support from the owners of the Great Southern Lumber Company, a major logging corporation, with the goal of preventing union organization and the merger of Black and white labor organizations.

== Background ==
=== Great Southern Lumber Company ===
The Great Southern Lumber Company, chartered by the Goodyear family in 1902, operated in southeastern Louisiana and southwestern Mississippi, primarily harvesting longleaf pine forests. Bogalusa, Louisiana, was developed as a company town, and the company's sawmill there began operation in 1908. At its peak, the Great Southern Lumber Company was the largest sawmill in the world, yet its workers earned only 30 cents an hour, despite the company's significant profits during World War I.

=== Racial violence ===
Racial tensions in Bogalusa were already high due to incidents like the lynching of Black veteran Lucius McCarty on August 31, 1919, following allegations of assaulting a white woman. McCarty was brutally killed, and his death further fueled racial animosity.

=== Union organization ===
Labor organizer Lum William worked to unite various unions into the Central Trades Assembly and sought formal recognition from the sawmill in September 1919. In response, the company fired many union organizers and prohibited union members from buying goods at local stores. This led to a strike, and the company brought in Black strikebreakers from New Orleans, exacerbating racial tensions.

== Attack ==
The "Bloody Bogalusa Massacre" occurred on November 22, 1919, following years of labor struggles in the timber industry. The Bogalusa sawmill was the world's largest, and labor demands for better wages were met with arrests of Black men for minor offenses, forcing them into forced labor at the mill. Sol Dacus, the head of the Black union, was defended by white union members, resulting in a confrontation.

The Great Southern Lumber Company deployed its private militia, consisting of 150 deputies, against unrest. A riot signal was sounded, leading to the attempted arrest of J. P. Bouchillon and Stanley O’Rourke, who were carrying shotguns. Conflicting accounts exist regarding who fired first, but the incident resulted in the deaths of four white unionists, including Bouchillon, O'Rourke, Lem Williams, and carpenter Thomas Gaines, along with two Black men. This event marked a significant setback for labor unionization efforts and led to the deployment of federal troops to restore order in Bogalusa.

== Aftermath ==
The Bogalusa saw mill killings were part of the American Red Summer of 1919, a period of civil unrest marked by attacks on Black communities and racial oppression in various U.S. cities and counties. These events, including the Bogalusa massacre, highlighted the challenges faced by Black labor organizers and the broader struggle for civil rights in the United States.

== See also ==
- List of worker deaths in United States labor disputes
- Washington race riot of 1919
- Mass racial violence in the United States
- List of incidents of civil unrest in the United States

== Bibliography ==
- Arnesen, Eric (2007). Encyclopedia of U.S. Labor and Working-class History, Volume 1. Taylor & Francis. ISBN 9780415968263. – Total pages: 1561
- Equal Justice Initiative (2019). "Lynching in America: Targeting Black Veterans". Equal Justice Initiative.
- Foner, Philip S. (1987). History of the Labor Movement in the United States: Postwar Struggles, 1918–1920. International Publishers Co. ISBN 9780717806522. – Total pages: 305
- Krugler, David F. (2014). 1919, The Year of Racial Violence. Cambridge University Press. ISBN 9781107061798. – Total pages: 332
- GlobalSecurity.org (2019). "Bogalusa LA Strike". GlobalSecurity.org.
- League for the Fourth International (February 2012). "Bloody Bogalusa, 1919: When Four White Unionists Died Defending Their Black Comrades". League for the Fourth International.
- The New York Times (October 5, 1919). "For Action on Race Riot Peril". The New York Times. New York. ISSN 1553-8095. OCLC 1645522.
- Norwood, Steven H. (August 1997). "Bogalusa Burning: The War Against Biracial Unionism in the Deep South, 1919". Journal of Southern History. 63 (3): 591–628. doi:10.2307/2211651. ISSN 0022-4642. JSTOR 2211651.
- Voogd, Jan (2008). Race Riots and Resistance: The Red Summer of 1919. Peter Lang. ISBN 9781433100673. – Total pages: 234
- Whitaker, Robert (2009). On the Laps of Gods: The Red Summer of 1919 and the Struggle for Justice That Remade a Nation. Three Rivers Press. ISBN 9780307339836. – Total pages: 386
