= Great Railroad Strike of 1877 =

Widespread US rail-worker strike

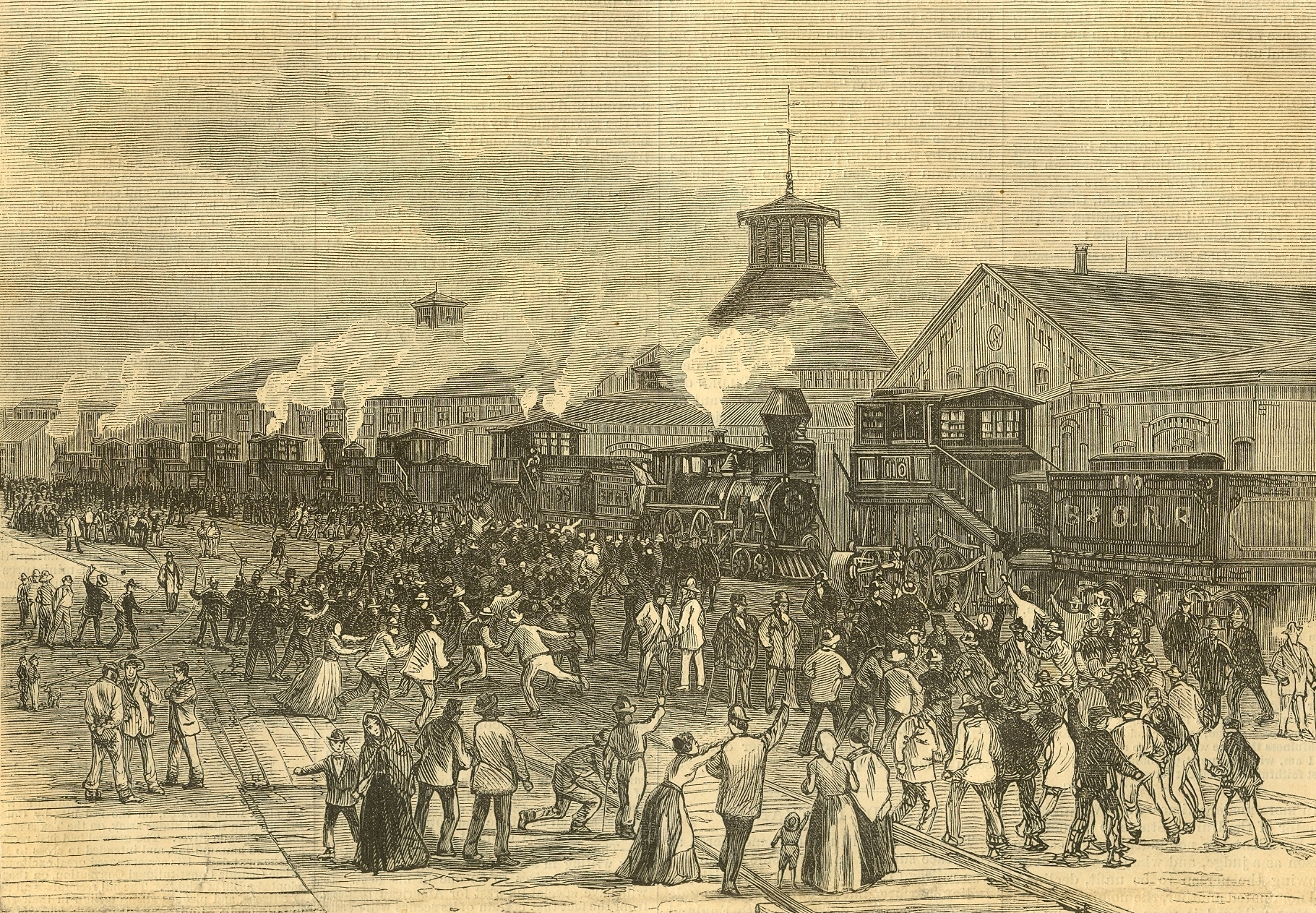
- Blockade of engines at Martinsburg, West Virginia on July 16, 1877
- Date: July 14 – September 4, 1877
- Goals: Wage increases
- Methods: Strikes, protests, demonstrations

Parties
Railroad workers; Workingmen's Party	Federal troops National Guard; Unofficial militias City police

Lead figures
	Monroe Heath

The Great Railroad Strike of 1877, sometimes referred to as the Great Upheaval, began on July 14 in Martinsburg, West Virginia, after the Baltimore and Ohio Railroad (B&O) cut wages for the third time in a year. It was the first strike that spread across multiple states in the U.S. The strike ended 52 days later, after it was put down by unofficial militias, the National Guard, and federal troops. Because of economic problems and pressure on wages by the railroads, workers in New York, Pennsylvania, Maryland, Illinois and Missouri, also went on strike. An estimated 126 to 160 people were killed in the unrest across the country. In Martinsburg, Pittsburgh, Philadelphia and other cities, workers burned down and destroyed both physical facilities and the rolling stock of the railroads—engines and railroad cars. Some locals feared that workers were rising in revolution, similar to the Paris Commune of 1871, while others joined their efforts against the railroads.

At the time, the workers were not represented by trade unions. Disruption was widespread, and at its height the strikes were supported by about 100,000 workers. Labor continued to work to organize into unions to work for better wages and conditions. Fearing future social disruption, many cities built armories to support local National Guard units; these defensive buildings still stand as symbols of the effort to suppress the labor unrest of this period.

With public attention on workers' wages and conditions, the B&O in 1880 founded an Employee Relief Association to provide death benefits and some health care. In 1884, it established a worker pension plan. Other improvements were implemented later.

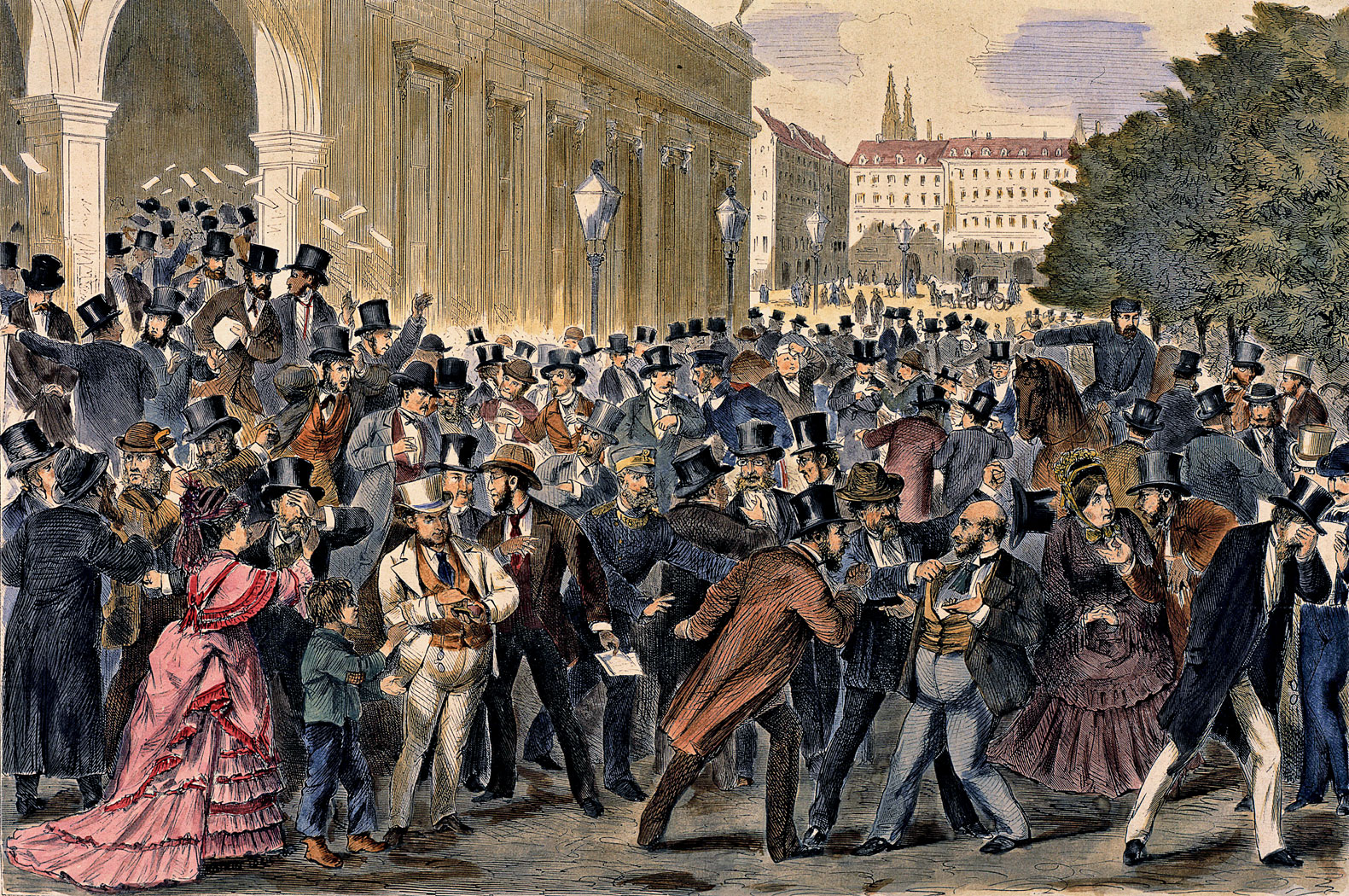
Black Friday, May 9, 1873

== Background ==
=== Panic of 1873 and the Long Depression ===
The Long Depression, which began in the United States with the financial Panic of 1873 and lasted 65 months, was the longest economic contraction in American history, including the later more famous, 45-month-long Great Depression of the 1930s. The failure of the Jay Cooke bank in New York was followed quickly by that of Henry Clews, and this set off a chain reaction of bank failures, which temporarily closed the New York stock market.

Unemployment rose dramatically, reaching 14 percent by 1876, with many more severely underemployed, and wages overall dropping to 45% of their previous level. Thousands of American businesses failed, which defaulted on more than a billion dollars of debt. One in four laborers in New York were out of work in the winter of 1873–1874. National construction of rail lines dropped from 7,500 miles of track in 1872 to just 1,600 miles in 1875, and production of iron and steel dropped as much as 45%.

Agricultural communities were also hit hard by the depression, as falling crop prices and rising debt pushed many farmers into financial ruin. The economic downturn led to an increase in foreclosures and farm bankruptcies, particularly in the Midwest and South, where reliance on credit was high. This financial strain fueled political movements such as the rise of the Greenback Party which advocated for the issuance of paper money not backed by gold to stimulate economic growth and ease debt burdens. The Long Depression also contributed to growing labor unrest, as striking workers demanded better wages and working conditions in the face of widespread economic hardship.

=== Reason for strike ===
When the Civil War ended, a boom in railroad construction ensued; roughly 35,000 miles (55,000 kilometers) of track was laid from coast to coast between 1866 and 1873. The railroads, the second-largest employer outside of agriculture, required large amounts of capital investment and thus entailed massive financial risk. Speculators fed large amounts of money into the industry, causing abnormal growth and over-expansion. Many banking firms invested a disproportionate share of depositors' funds in the railroads.

In addition to Cooke's direct infusion of capital into the railroads, the firm had become a federal agent for the government's direct financing of railroad construction. As building track in areas where land had not yet been cleared or settled required land grants and loans that only the government could provide, the use of Cooke's firm as a conduit for federal funding worsened the effects that Cooke's bankruptcy had on the nation's economy.

In the wake of the Panic of 1873, a bitter antagonism between workers and the leaders of industry developed. Immigration from Europe was underway, as was migration of rural workers into the cities, increasing competition for jobs and enabling companies to drive down wages and easily lay off workers. By 1877, 10 percent wage cuts, distrust of capitalists and poor working conditions led workers to conduct numerous railroad strikes that prevented the trains from moving, with spiraling effects in other parts of the economy. Workers continued to organize to try to improve their conditions. Employers and liberals feared the spread of communism, particularly through organizations like the Workingmen's Party recently founded in Chicago, and often drew comparisons between such movements and the recent Paris Commune of 1871.

Many of the immigrant workers were Catholics, and their church had forbidden participation in secret societies since 1743, partially as a reaction against the anti-Catholicism of Freemasonry. But by the late 19th century, the Knights of Labor (KOL), a national and predominately European and Catholic organization, had 700,000 members seeking to represent all workers. In 1888, Archbishop James Cardinal Gibbons of Baltimore sympathized with the workers and collaborated with other bishops to lift the prohibition against workers joining the KOL. Other workers also took actions, and unrest marked the following decades. In 1886, Samuel Gompers founded the American Federation of Labor for the skilled craft trades, attracting skilled workers from other groups. Other labor organizing followed.

== Strike ==
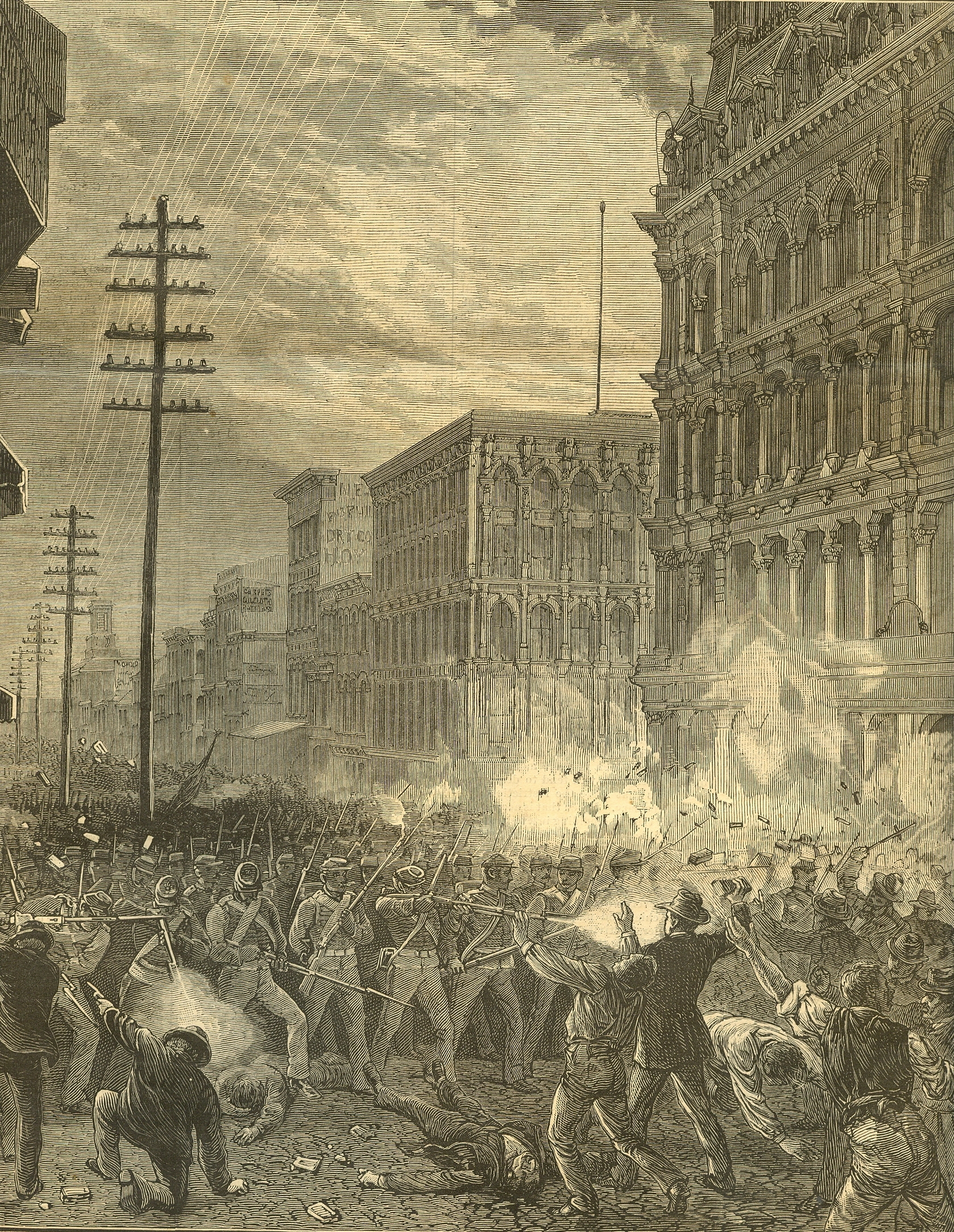
Maryland National Guard's Sixth Regiment fighting its way west along main downtown commercial thoroughfare Baltimore Street through Baltimore, Maryland, July 20, 1877

The strike began when Baltimore and Ohio Railroad (B&O) president John W. Garrett cut wages by ten percent to increase dividends by the same percentage. By July 14, 1877, it had spread to the Martinsburg, West Virginia, station where strikers refused to let freight trains pass. A crowd had gathered in support of the railroad workers. Due to violence against workers who refused to take part in the strike, and since the police proved ineffective in stopping such violence, West Virginia Governor Henry M. Mathews sent in militia forces to move the trains. One militiaman was shot by a striker while trying to operate a switch; the militiaman returned fire. Both were wounded, and the striker died. In the end, the militia failed to get the trains moving again, as strikebreakers were unwilling to operate them. Mathews then requested federal troops, which newly elected President Rutherford B. Hayes reluctantly agreed to send. The B&O billed the federal government for transporting the troops into Martinsburg.

=== Maryland ===
Meanwhile, the strike spread into western Maryland to the major railroad hub of Cumberland and county seat of Allegany County where railway workers stopped freight and passenger traffic.

In Baltimore, the Fifth ("Dandy Fifth") and Sixth Regiments of the former state militia, reorganized after the Civil War as the Maryland National Guard, were called up by Maryland Governor John Lee Carroll, at the request of Garrett. The Fifth marched down North Howard Street from its armory above the old Richmond Market (at present North Howard and West Read Streets) in the Mount Vernon-Belvedere neighborhood. It was generally unopposed as it headed south for the B&O's general headquarters and main depot at the Camden Street Station to board waiting westward trains to Hagerstown and Cumberland. The Sixth assembled at its armory at East Fayette and North Front Streets (by the old Phoenix Shot Tower) in the Old Town /Jonestown area and headed to Camden. It had to fight its way west through sympathetic Baltimore citizens, rioters and striking workers. The march erupted into bloodshed along Baltimore Street, the main downtown commercial thoroughfare and the way to Camden. It was a horrible scene, reminiscent of the worst of the bloody "Pratt Street Riots" of the Civil War era in April 1861, over 15 years earlier. When the outnumbered troops of the 6th Regiment finally fired volleys on an attacking crowd, they killed 10 civilians and wounded 25. The rioters injured several members of the National Guard, damaged B&O engines and train cars, and burned portions of the train station at South Howard and West Camden Streets. The National Guard was trapped in the Camden Yards and besieged by armed rioters. Hayes sent 2,000 federal troops and 600 U.S. Marines to Baltimore to restore order.

=== New York ===
There were strike actions in Albany, Syracuse and Buffalo, New York, on other railroad lines. On July 25, 1877, workers gathered on Van Woert Street Rail Crossing in Albany. The workers waited for a train arrival then proceeded to barrage the train with projectiles. The arrival of militiamen caused the crowd to rouse and throw the projectiles at the militia. A second night proceeded of attacks on the rail line. After the second night, the mayor rescinded the militia and ordered local police to protect the rail. Workers in industries other than railroads still attacked them because the rails cut through the cities and dominated city life. Their resentment of the railroads' economic power was expressed in physical attacks against them at a time when many workers' wages were lowered. Protestors "included cross-class elements from other work sites, small businesses, and commercial establishments. Some protestors acted out of solidarity with the strikers, but many more vented militant displeasure against dangerous railroad traffic that crisscrossed urban centers in that area." Two people were killed in New York.

=== Pennsylvania ===
==== Pittsburgh ====
Pittsburgh became the site of the worst violence of the related strikes. Thomas Alexander Scott of the Pennsylvania Railroad, described as one of the first robber barons, suggested that the strikers should be given "a rifle diet for a few days and see how they like that kind of bread". As in some other cities and towns, local law enforcement officers, such as sheriffs, deputies and police, refused to fire on the strikers. Several Pennsylvania National Guard units were ordered into service by Governor John Hartranft, including the 3rd Pennsylvania Infantry Regiment under the command of Colonel George R. Snowden.

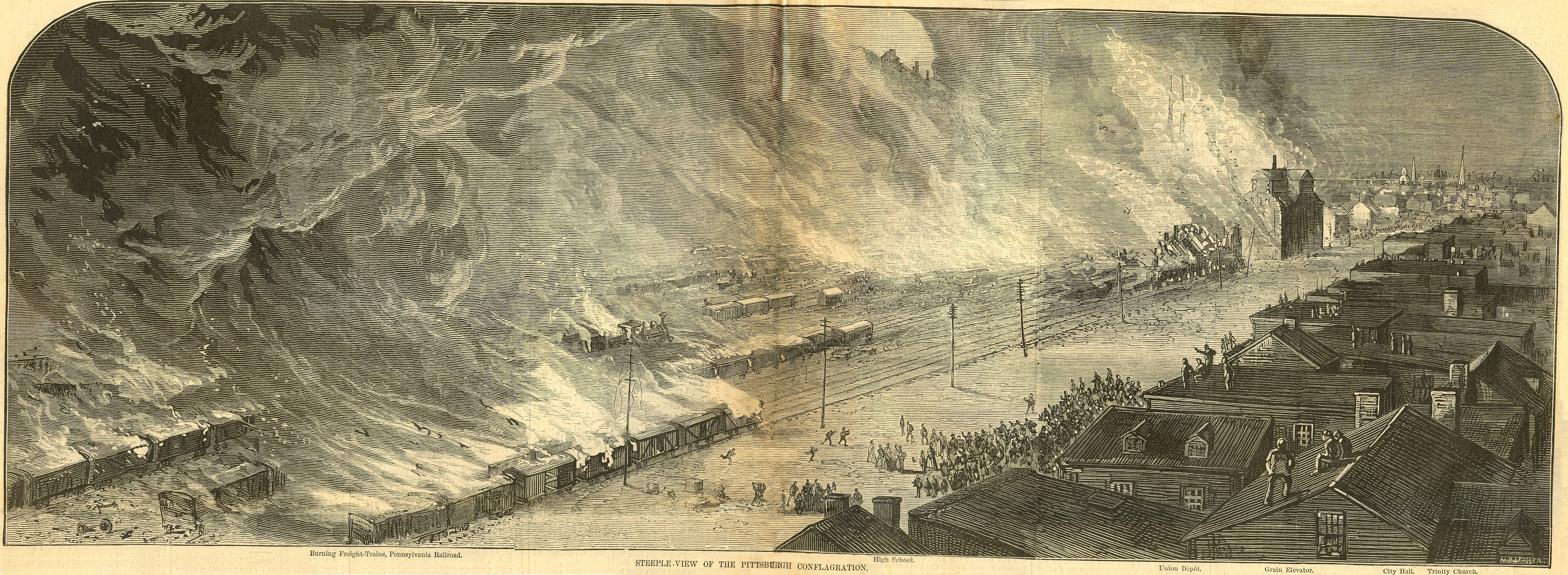
Burning of Pennsylvania Railroad and Union Depot, Pittsburgh, Pennsylvania, July 21–22, 1877, engraving from Harper's Weekly

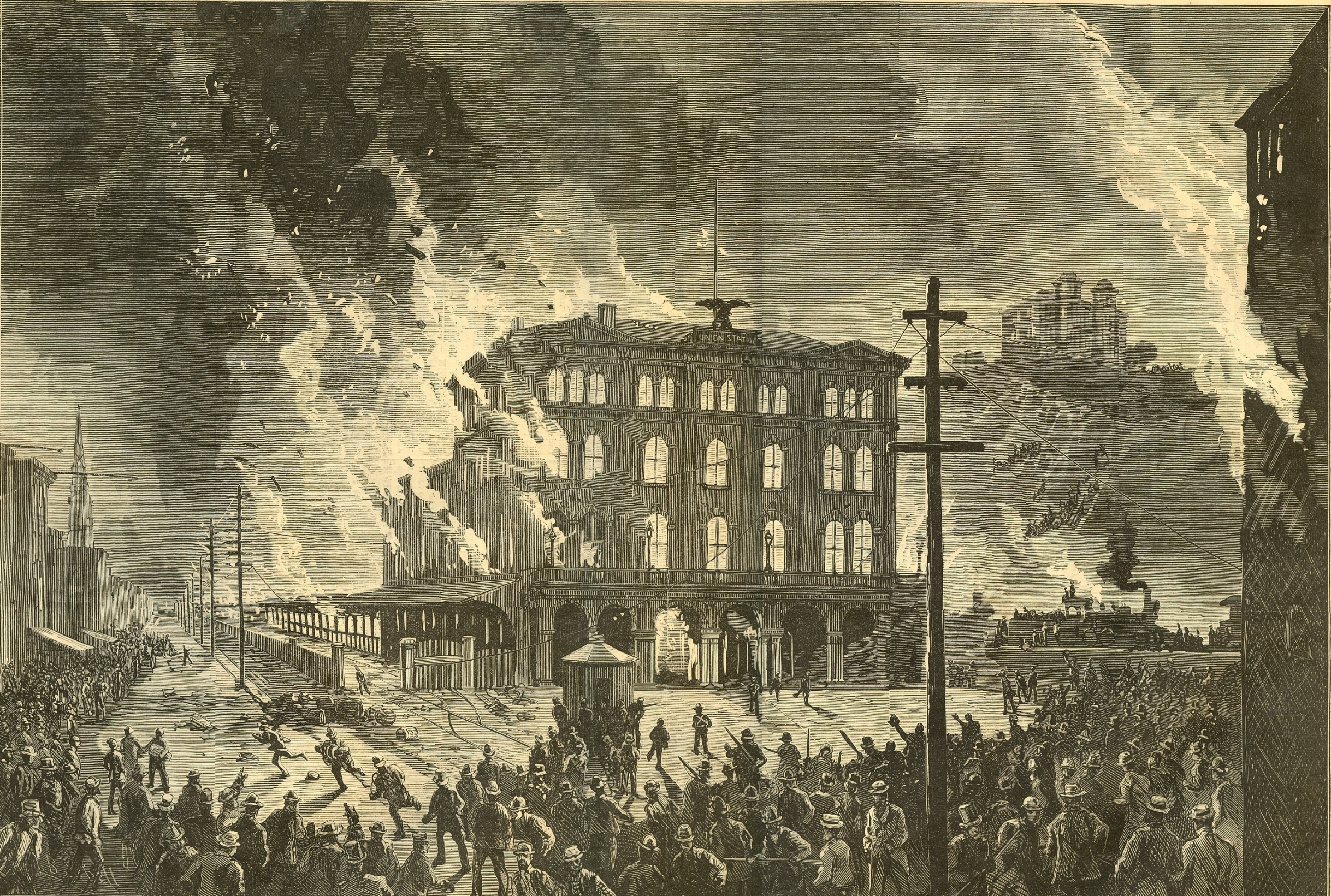
Burning of Union Depot, Pittsburgh, Pennsylvania, July 21–22, 1877, engraving from Harper's Weekly

On July 21, National Guard members bayoneted and fired on rock-throwing strikers, killing 20 people and wounding 29. Instead of calming the strikers, these actions made them even angrier which led them to fight back and force the National Guard to retreat into a railroad roundhouse. The strikers then set fires that burned down 39 buildings and destroyed equipment, including 104 locomotives and 1,245 freight and passenger cars. On July 22, the National Guard mounted an assault on the strikers, shooting their way out of the roundhouse and killing 20 more people on their way out of the city. After more than a month of rioting and bloodshed in Pittsburgh, Hayes sent in federal troops to end the strikes.

==== Philadelphia ====
Philadelphia strikers battled local National Guard units. They set fire to much of downtown and caused widespread destruction. As violence escalated, Hartranft gained assistance and federal troops from Hayes to put down the uprising. The troops quickly suppressed the strike, as they did in other cities, leaving over 100 dead nationwide, one of which was in Philadelphia. Though the strike failed, it highlighted rising tensions between workers and business owners, paving the way for the growth of labor unions and future labor rights movements.

==== Reading ====
Workers in Reading—the state's third-largest industrial city at the time—also went on strike. The city was home of the engine works and shops of the Philadelphia and Reading Railway, against which engineers struck since April 1877. The National Guard shot 16 citizens. Preludes to the massacre included fresh work stoppage by all classes of the railroad's local workforce, mass marches, blocking of rail traffic, and trainyard arson. Workers burned down the only railroad bridge offering connections to the west, in order to prevent local National Guard companies from being mustered to actions in Harrisburg or Pittsburgh. Authorities used the National Guard, Coal and Iron Police, and Pinkerton detectives in an attempt to break the strike. Philadelphia and Reading Railway management mobilized a private militia, the members of which committed the shootings in the city.

==== Shamokin ====
On July 25, a group of 1,000 men and boys, many of them coal miners, marched to the Reading Railroad Depot in Shamokin. They looted the depot when the town announced it would pay them only $1/day for emergency public employment. The mayor, who owned the coal mines, organized an unofficial militia. It committed 14 civilian shooting casualties, resulting in the deaths of two persons.

==== Scranton ====
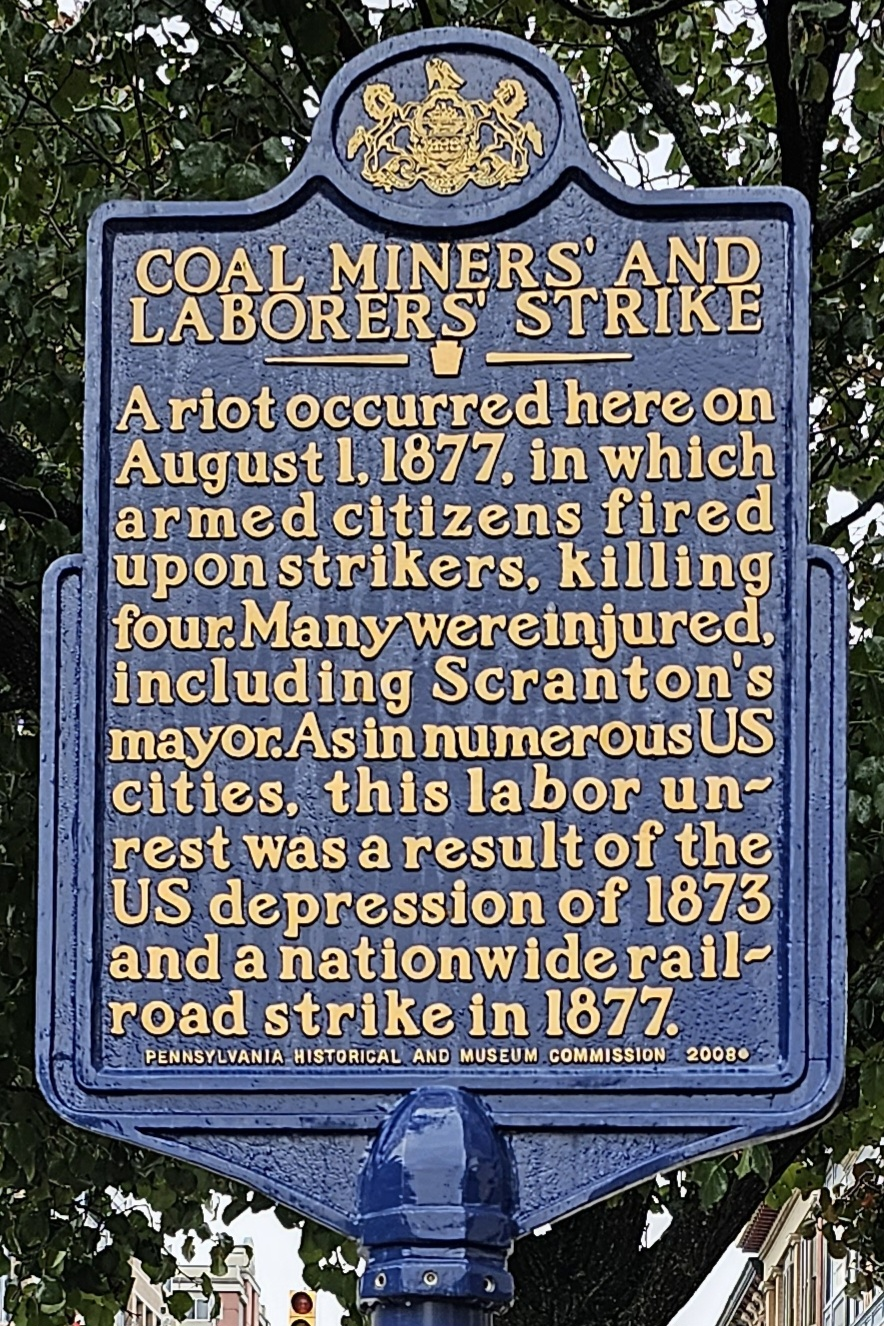
Pennsylvania state historical marker for the events in Scranton

On August 1, 1877, in Scranton, one day after railroad workers commenced a strike, a city posse of 51 men armed with new rifles and under the command of William Walker Scranton, general manager of the Lackawanna Iron & Coal Company, returned fire on a group of rioters and strikers. The posse killed or fatally wounded four and wounded an undetermined number of others, estimated at 20 to 50, according to different sources.

Hartranft declared Scranton to be under martial law; it was occupied by state and federal troops armed with Gatling guns. Later the posse leader and about 20 of his men were charged with assault and murder. They were all acquitted. Under military occupation, and suffering the effects of protracted violence against them, the miners ended their strike without achieving any of their demands.

=== Illinois ===
On July 24, rail traffic in Chicago was paralyzed when angry mobs of unemployed citizens wreaked havoc in the rail yards, by shutting down both the B&O and the Illinois Central railroads. Soon, other railroads throughout the state were brought to a standstill, with demonstrators shutting down railroad traffic in Bloomington, Aurora, Peoria, Decatur, Urbana and other rail centers throughout Illinois. In sympathy, coal miners in the pits at Braidwood, LaSalle, Springfield, and Carbondale went on strike as well. In Chicago, the Workingmen's Party organized demonstrations that drew crowds of 20,000 people.

Judge Thomas Drummond of the United States Court of Appeals for the Seventh Circuit, who was overseeing numerous railroads that declared bankruptcy in the wake of the earlier financial Panic of 1873, ruled that, "A strike or other unlawful interference with the trains will be a violation of the United States law, and the court will be bound to take notice of it and enforce the penalty." Drummond told the U.S. Marshals to protect the railroads and asked for federal troops to enforce his decision; he subsequently had strikers arrested and tried them for contempt of court.

The Mayor of Chicago, Monroe Heath, recruited 5,000 men as an unofficial militia, asking for help in restoring order. They were partially successful and shortly thereafter were reinforced by the arrival of the Illinois National Guard and U.S. Army troops, mobilized by the governor. On July 25, violence between police and the mob erupted, with events reaching a peak the following day. These blood-soaked confrontations between police and enraged mobs are known as the Battle of the Viaduct, as they took place near the Halsted Street viaduct, although confrontations also took place at nearby 16th Street, on 12th, and on Canal Street. The headline of the Chicago Times read, "Terrors Reign, The Streets of Chicago Given Over to Howling Mobs of Thieves and Cutthroats". Order was finally restored. An estimated 20 men and boys died, none of whom were law enforcement or troops; scores more were wounded, and the loss of property was valued in the millions of dollars.

=== Missouri ===
On July 21, workers in the industrial rail hub of East St. Louis, Illinois, halted all freight traffic while the city remained in the control of the strikers for almost a week. The St. Louis Workingman's Party led a group of approximately 500 men across the Mississippi River in an act of solidarity with the nearly 1,000 workers on strike. It was the catalyst for labor unrest, which resulted in thousands of workers in several industries to strike for the eight-hour day and a ban on child labor. This was the first such general strike in the United States.

The strike on both sides of the river was ended after the governor appealed for help and gained the intervention of some 3,000 federal troops and 5,000 deputized special police. These armed forces killed at least 18 people in skirmishes around the city. On July 28, 1877, they took control of the Relay Depot, the command center for the uprising, and arrested approximately seventy strikers.

=== California ===
When news of the strikes reached the west coast, the Central Pacific Railroad rescinded its 10 percent wage cut, but this did not prevent the type of worker unrest seen in the east. In San Francisco, the Workingmen's Party called for a rally on July 23, which was attended by eight to ten thousand people. Despite attempts by the organizers to focus the crowd's energy against the railroad monopolies, the rally soon turned to a riot against the local Chinese population. This led to new alliances between workers and small business owners aimed at refusing to hire Chinese laborers and boycotting Chinese goods.

== Strike ends ==
The strike began to lose momentum when Hayes sent federal troops from city to city. This was a prime example of the U.S. military being used against industrial action. General Phillip Sheridan and his troops were sent from the Great Plains to Chicago to break up the strike. Federal troops from the South previously used in the Reconstruction after the Civil War were also sent to the striking cities to disperse the crowds. These troops from the South had just been guarding the statehouse in Louisiana a few weeks earlier. They were sent to stop the riots of both the railroad laborers and the residents of the striking cities.

Many residents in Buffalo, Syracuse, and Albany, New York, joined the railroad workers in the strike because they were tired of their urban streets being used by the railroad companies. The railroads that ran through these cities were often very dangerous and caused plenty of issues for urban businesses and city dwellers alike. Even with the combined efforts of the railroad strikers and upset citizens, the troops stood their ground against the strikers and obeyed the orders received from their commanders. This, combined with the strikers' sporadic and unorganized revolts, ultimately led to the downfall of the strike. These troops broke strike after strike, until approximately 45 days after it had started, the strike was over. The lack of a political leader or party's support of the revolt caused the strike's power to dissipate as well.

== Aftermath and legacy ==
In total, there were likely over 100,000 people that were involved in the strike. Of those involved, nearly 1,000 people were jailed, and about 126 to 160 were killed. The strike caused over 50% of the United States' rail freight to stop for some time.

In the end, the strikers were unable to meaningfully resist the organized violence coordinated against them by local, state, and federal governments. However, the high cost of organizing such violence in both fiscal and political terms was not lost on the corporate and government leaders behind it. Robert Harris of the Chicago, Burlington and Quincy Railroad was quoted as saying: "A reduction of pay to employes [sic] may be as expensive to the Co. as an increase of pay." Despite the strike not resulting in an immediate acceptance of worker demands, over the next several years many railroads restored all or part of the initial pay cuts and were reluctant to put any further pressure on wages.

The strike led to the rise of certain political parties including the Workingmen's Party of the United States, the Greenback-Labor Party, and the Populist Party. The strike ultimately led to increased membership in the Knights of Labor as well. Labor rights became a major national issue for both the Republican and Democratic Parties. The Bureau of Labor was formed by Congress in 1884.

=== Economic effects ===
Strikers in Pittsburgh burned in total 39 buildings, 104 engines, 46–66 passenger cars, and 1,200–1,383 freight cars. Damage estimates ranged from five to 10 million dollars.

=== Labor relations ===
After the strike, union organizers planned for their next battles while politicians and business leaders took steps to prevent a repetition of this chaos. Many states enacted conspiracy statutes. Unions became better organized as well as more competent, and the number of strikes increased. The tumultuous Knights of Labor grew to be a national organization of predominately white Catholic workers, numbering 700,000 by the early 1880s. In the 1880s nearly 10,000 strike actions and lockouts took place. In 1886 nearly 700,000 workers went on strike. Business leaders strengthened their opposition to the unions, often firing men who tried to organize or join them. Nonetheless, the labor movement continued to grow.

One result of the strike was increased public awareness of the grievances of railroad workers. On May 1, 1880, the B&O Railroad, which had the lowest wage rate of any major railroad, established the Baltimore and Ohio Employees' Relief Association, which provided coverage for sickness, injury from accidents, and a death benefit. In 1884, the B&O became the first major employer to offer a pension plan.

=== Role of police ===
Police played a crucial role in suppressing the protests and maintaining order on behalf of business interests. As the strikes spread across various cities, local police were the first to confront the workers, using force to try and break up the demonstrations. When the protests escalated, particularly in cities like Pittsburgh and Chicago, the state and federal governments called in military support, including federal troops and National Guard units, to support the police in quelling the unrest. Police used aggressive tactics, including arresting and beating protesters, to restore control. The state's reliance on police and military intervention demonstrated their commitment to protecting the interests of the railroad companies and their investors, showing how police were instrumental in upholding the existing power dynamics during labor unrest. This marked a shift in how the government would respond to labor strikes, with law enforcement playing an increasingly central role in managing such conflicts.

=== National Guard ===
Militias had almost completely disappeared in the Midwest after the Civil War, leaving many cities defenseless to civil unrest. In response to the strike, West Virginia Governor Mathews was the first state commander-in-chief to call up militia units to restore peace. This action has been viewed in retrospect as a catalyst that would transform the National Guard. States formed new National Guard units and constructed armories in numerous industrial cities. For workers and employers alike, the strikes had shown the power of workers to challenge the status quo. A National Guard member in Pittsburgh pointed out that the workers were driven by "one spirit and one purpose among them – that they were justified in resorting to any means to break down the power of the corporations."

In the years to come, the National Guard would quell strikers and double their forces; between 1886 and 1895, the National Guard put down 328 civil disorders, mostly in the industrial states of Illinois, Pennsylvania, Ohio and New York; workers came to see the guardsmen as tools of their employers. Attempts to utilize the National Guard to quell violent outbreaks in 1877 highlighted its ineffectiveness, and, in some cases, its propensity to side with strikers and rioters. In response, as earlier riots in the mid-1800s had prompted the modernization of police forces, the violence of 1877 provided the impetus for modernizing the National Guard, "to aid the civil officers, to suppress or prevent riot or insurrections".

=== Commemoration ===
In 2003 the Baltimore and Ohio Railroad Martinsburg Shops, where the strike began, were declared a National Historic Landmark. In 2013 a historical marker commemorating the event was placed in Baltimore by the Maryland Historical Trust and Maryland State Highway Administration. Its inscription reads:

The first national strike began July 16, 1877, with Baltimore and Ohio Railroad workers in Martinsburg, West Virginia, and Baltimore, Maryland. It spread across the nation halting rail traffic and closing factories in reaction to widespread worker discontent over wage cuts and conditions during a national depression. Broken by Federal troops in early August, the strike energized the labor movement and was precursor to labor unrest in the 1880s and 1890s.

Another was placed in 1978 in Martinsburg by the West Virginia Department of Culture and History.

=== Posse Comitatus Act ===
The use of federal troops prompted bipartisan support for the 1878 Posse Comitatus Act, limiting the power of the president to use federal troops for domestic law enforcement.

== See also ==
- Great Railroad Strike of 1922
- List of US strikes by size
- History of rail transport in the United States
- List of incidents of civil unrest in the United States
