= David Wieck =

American activist and philosophy professor (1921–1997)

- Born: December 13, 1921
- Died: July 1, 1997 (aged 75)
- Occupations: Writer, philosophy professor
- Known for: Pacifism

David Thoreau Wieck (1921–1997) was an American activist and philosophy professor.

== Career ==
David Thoreau Wieck was born on December 13, 1921. His father, Edward A. Wieck, worked for the Russell Sage Foundation and wrote about miners' associations. David later wrote a biography of his mother, Agnes Burns Wieck.

Wieck began publishing anarchist and antiwar articles in 1938 and was a conscientious objector during World War II. He published A Field of Broken Stones with another conscientious objector, Lowell Naeve, about their time in prison. After the war, Wieck edited Resistance with Paul Goodman. Wieck also edited the anarcho-pacifist journal Liberation. He was a lifelong friend of fellow pacifist activist David Dellinger. Both were imprisoned in the Federal Correctional Institution, Danbury, as conscientious objectors and protested its racial segregationist policies.

He became a philosophy professor at the Rensselaer Polytechnic Institute in Troy, New York.

His translation of Giovanni Baldelli's Social Anarchism sustained Howard Ehrlich's journal Social Anarchism for many years. Wieck had translated the volume from Italian but soon after its printing, the publisher went bankrupt and the books were not sold until they were offered to Wieck a decade later as part of liquidating the publisher's assets. Ehrlich offered the book to encourage subscriptions. Wieck also presented at the Boston 1979 Sacco and Vanzetti conference. He died July 1, 1997.

== Selected works ==
- A Field of Broken Stones
- Woman from Spillertown: A Memoir of Agnes Burns Wieck (1992)
