= Pana riot =

1899 riot in Pana, Illinois

Pana massacre
- Date: April 10, 1899
- Location: Pana, Illinois, United States
- Also known as: Pana riot
- Participants: White union miners Black miners (strikebreakers) from Alabama
- Outcome: Black miners were driven out of Pana
- Deaths: 7 (two whites, one miner killed by white policeman; and five black miners); six black miners wounded

The Pana riot, or Pana massacre, was a coal mining labor conflict and also a racial conflict that occurred on April 10, 1899, in Pana, Illinois, and resulted in the deaths of seven people. It was one of many similar labor conflicts in the coal mining regions of Illinois that occurred in 1898 and 1899.

The United Mine Workers of America had called a strike that affected numerous mines; mine owners retaliated by hiring guards and some 300 African-American miners from Alabama to serve as strikebreakers. After a confrontation in which a white union miner was killed, the miners turned on black strikebreakers, believing them responsible. Two whites were killed in the violence and five blacks, with another six African Americans wounded.

== Background ==
Striking white miners had been out of work for nearly a year when the Overholt brothers, part owners of one of the four Pana mines, went to Alabama to recruit African-American "scab" labor (strikebreakers) in an effort to re-open the mines. Previous attempts to open the mines with white non-union workers had failed amid violence. The state had stationed militia in Pana to preserve peace. Nearly 300 African Americans were recruited to work in the mines and break the strike.

According to first-hand accounts collected in the 1940s by Eleanor Burnhorn, a well-known Pana history teacher, the new African-American recruits from Alabama had been told they would be working in newly opened mines. They were not aware of the strike until they reached the town. There the company housed the black non-union workers in poor conditions, either inside the confines of Springside Mine on the northeast side of town, or in a building located just west of Penwell mine. Local residents derogatorily called it the "Alabama Hotel".

Despite the promise of better wages in the North, black workers who ran the gauntlet of strikers were paid by the company in coupons or scrip, good only at stores designated by the mine owners. They were paid less than the white strikers, receiving 27 1/2 cents per tonne. In early 1899, the black coal miners at Pana formed the Afro-Anglo Mutual Association (AAMA) in order to protect their interests in relation to the white union miners. The Daily Breeze described its leader, Henry Stevens, as being "hard as iron and his muscles stand out like whip cords. His biceps are as large as the calf of an ordinary man's leg. He stands about six feet, two inches tall and he will weigh in the neighborhood of 200 pounds."

Due to previous labor unrest at Pana, the AAMA lobbied Governor John Riley Tanner to guarantee that black and nonunion miners would receive the same protection from the National Guard as the union miners. The pleas seem to have been ignored because, soon after, Governor Tanner removed the soldiers who were keeping order. Black strikebreakers were left at the mercy of local whites, who were openly hostile to them. Stevens sent a delegate to Governor Tanner, who asked that the soldiers be retained in Pana, but Stevens' request was ignored. The act of diplomacy, though unsuccessful, represented the black miners' will to resolve the situation peaceably.

== Gun battle ==
On April 10, 1899, a confrontation occurred in Pana. After a long-brewing bad feeling between strikebreakers and union coal miners Henry Stevens, one of the strikebreakers fired his weapon. During the gunfire that ensued a union miner, Exavier LeCocq was shot and killed. LeCocq was not part of the gunbattle but a bystander.

Deaths among the non-union strikebreakers included Henry Johnson, Louis Hooks, James L. James, and Charles Watkins from Georgia, and Julia Dash, wife of a black miner. The black wounded included Clinton Rolo, Louis Whitfield, Charles York, Ed Delinquest, F. C. Dorsey, and George Freak.

General mayhem flared across Pana that night and into the next day. Governor Tanner sent a National Guard unit that quelled the violence the next day. The strikebreakers that had been brought to Pana in 1898 from primarily Birmingham left Pana when the mine operators closed the mines. The mine operator would eventually come to an agreement with the local union. A few months later the union and mine owner had an agreement and the mine reopened with exclusive union miners.

== Grand jury and trials ==
No one was held legally accountable for any of the deaths that occurred on April 10, 1899. Henry Stevens was convicted of assault and served one year in prison.

== Aftermath ==
After April 10, many of Pana's black residents moved away, with travel support from the union. Operators and union miners began arbitration talks to settle the strike, but black miners objected because they were not represented.

The mine operators, to demonstrate good faith in arbitration but also out of fear of violence, temporarily shut down all of Pana's mines in late June. The black community, lacking any type of support networks, was left impoverished and destitute by the extremely low wages paid by the operators. They appealed to Governor Tanner for financial support to assist them in returning to Alabama. Ultimately, many paid their own way to go to Weir, Kansas, where they were recruited to break another mining strike. According to historian Millie Meyerholtz, 211 blacks moved west, primarily to Weir. Only 63 returned to Alabama and the Jim Crow South. Those who remained in Pana were driven out during the rest of the summer. Many ended up in Springfield. Those who settled there faced violence again during the Springfield Race Riot of 1908.

== See also ==
- List of massacres in Illinois
- Murder of workers in labor disputes in the United States
- List of incidents of civil unrest in the United States
- Lynching of F. W. Stewart
- List of homicides in Illinois
