= List of conflicts in the United States =

This is a list of conflicts in the United States. Conflicts are arranged chronologically from the late modern period to contemporary history. This list includes (but is not limited to) the following: Indian wars, skirmishes, wars of independence, liberation wars, colonial wars, undeclared wars, proxy wars, territorial disputes, and world wars. Also listed might be any battle that was itself only part of an operation of a campaign of a theater of a war. There may also be periods of violent civil unrest listed, such as riots, shootouts, spree killings, massacres, terrorist attacks, and civil wars.

== Late modern period ==
=== 18th century ===
- 1775 – 1783 American Revolutionary War
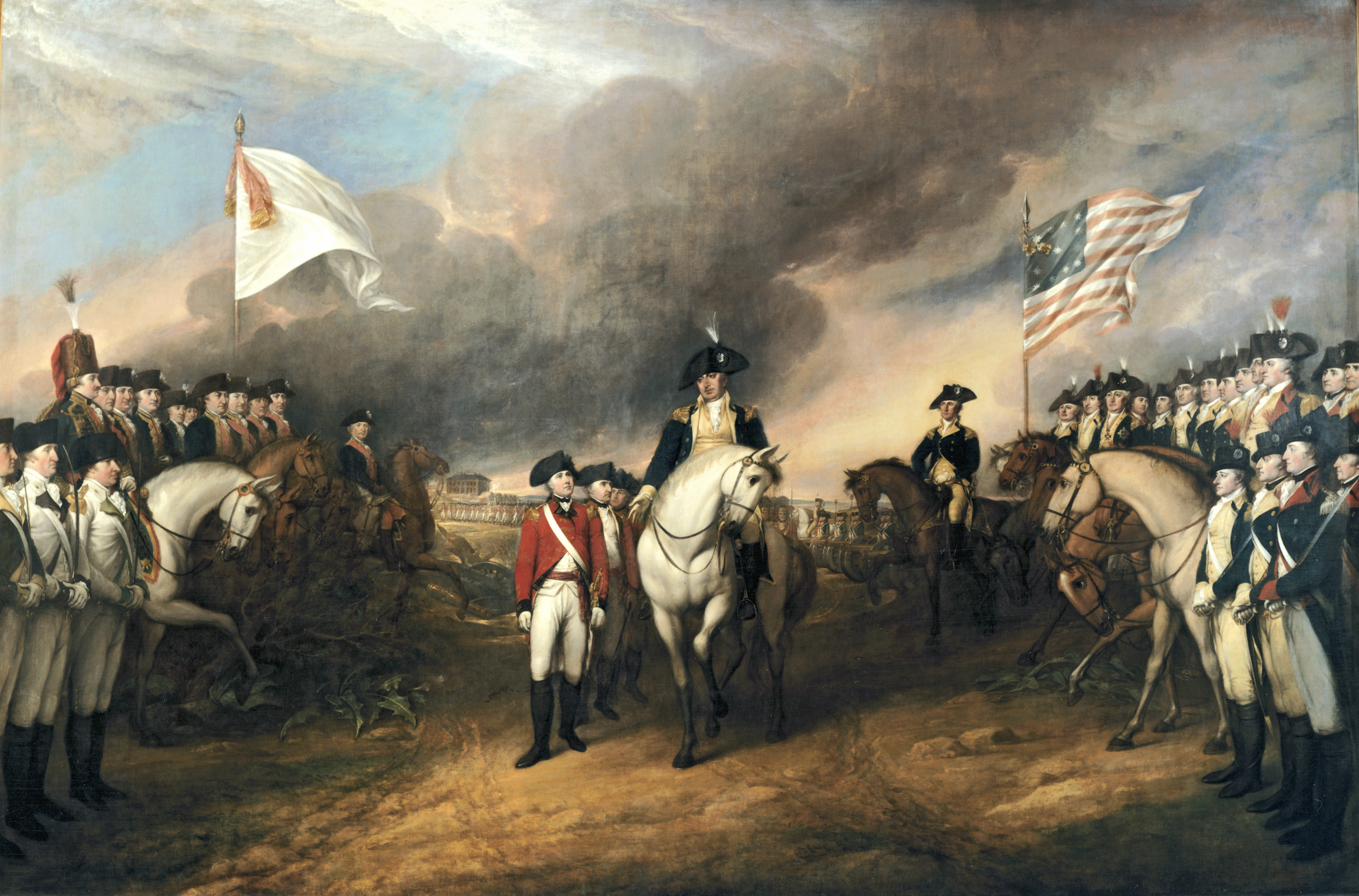
  Surrender of Lord Cornwallis at Yorktown.
  - 1775
    - Battles of Lexington and Concord
    - Siege of Boston
    - Battle of Ticonderoga
    - Battle off Fairhaven
    - Battle of Machias
    - Battle of Bunker Hill
    - Battle of Great Bridge
    - Battle of Great Cane Brake
  - 1776
    - Battle of Moore's Creek Bridge
    - Battle of Long Island
    - Battle of Harlem Heights
    - Battle of Mamaroneck
    - Battle of White Plains
    - Battle of Fort Washington
    - Battle of Trenton
  - 1777
    - Battle of Princeton
    - Battle of Ridgefield
    - Battle of Gwynn's Island
    - Battle of Oriskany
    - Battle of Machias (1777)
    - Battle of Bennington
    - Battle of Setauket
    - Battle of Brandywine Creek
    - Battle of Saratoga
    - Philadelphia campaign
    - Battle of Germantown
  - 1778
    - Battle of Monmouth
    - Battle of Alligator Creek Bridge
    - Capture of Savannah
  - 1779
    - Battle of Baton Rouge (1779)
    - Battle of Van Creek
    - Battle of Kettle Creek
    - Battle of Brier Creek
    - Battle of Vincennes
    - Battle of Stono Ferry
    - Battle of Paulus Hook
  - 1780
    - Battle of Young's House
    - Siege of Charleston
    - Battle of Monck's Corner
    - Battle of Lenud's Ferry
    - Battle of Connecticut Farms
    - Battle of Mobley's Meeting House
    - Battle of Camden
    - Battle of Musgrove Mill
    - Battle of Wahab's Plantation
    - Battle of King's Mountain
    - Battle of Tearcoat Swamp
    - Battle of Fishdam Ford
    - Battle of Blackstock's Farm
  - 1781
    - Battle of Cowpens
    - Battle of Cowan's Ford
    - Battle of Guilford Court House
    - Battle of Groton Heights
    - Siege of Yorktown
- 1776 – 1794 Cherokee–American wars
  - October 17, 1793 Battle of Hightower
  - 1794 Nickajack Expedition
- 1784 Third Pennamite War
  - August 14, 1784 Awa'uq Massacre
- 1785 – 1795 Northwest Indian War
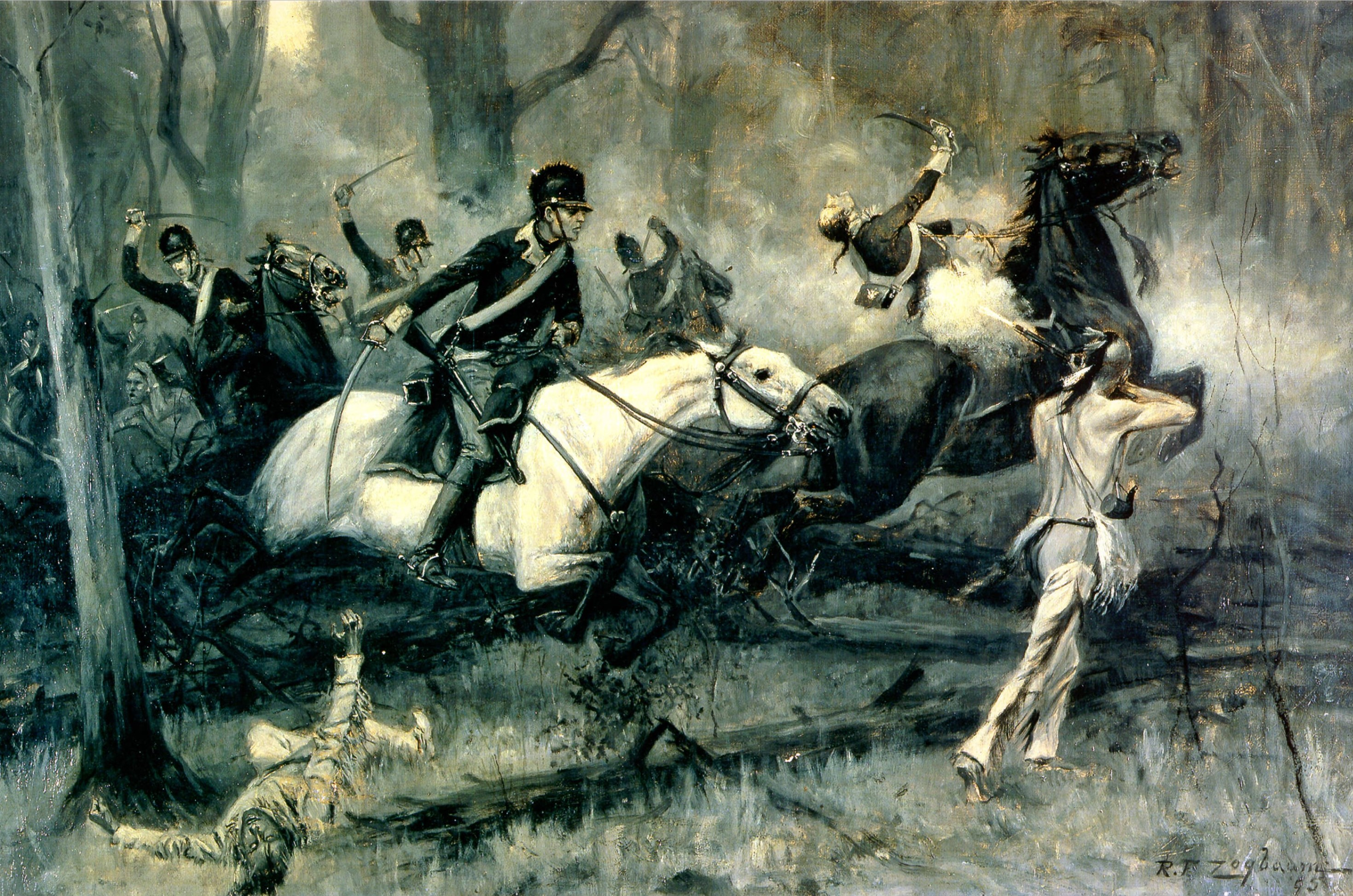
  Battle of Fallen Timbers
  - 1786: Skirmishes around Vincennes, Logan's raid
  - 1790: Harmar campaign
  - 1791: Siege of Dunlap's Station, Blackberry Campaign, Battle of Kenapacomaqua, St. Clair's defeat, Big Bottom massacre
  - 1794: Battle of Fort Recovery, Battle of Fallen Timbers
- June 20, 1783 Pennsylvania Mutiny of 1783
- August 29, 1786 – February 1787 Shays' Rebellion
- September 20, 1786 Paper Money Riot
- Unification of Hawaii (1790 - 1795)
  - 1790: Battle of Kepaniwai, 1790 Footprints
  - 1791: Battle of Kawaihae
  - 1795: Battle of Nuʻuanu
- 1791 – 1794 Whiskey Rebellion
- 1797: Battle of San Juan
- 1798 – 1800 Quasi-War
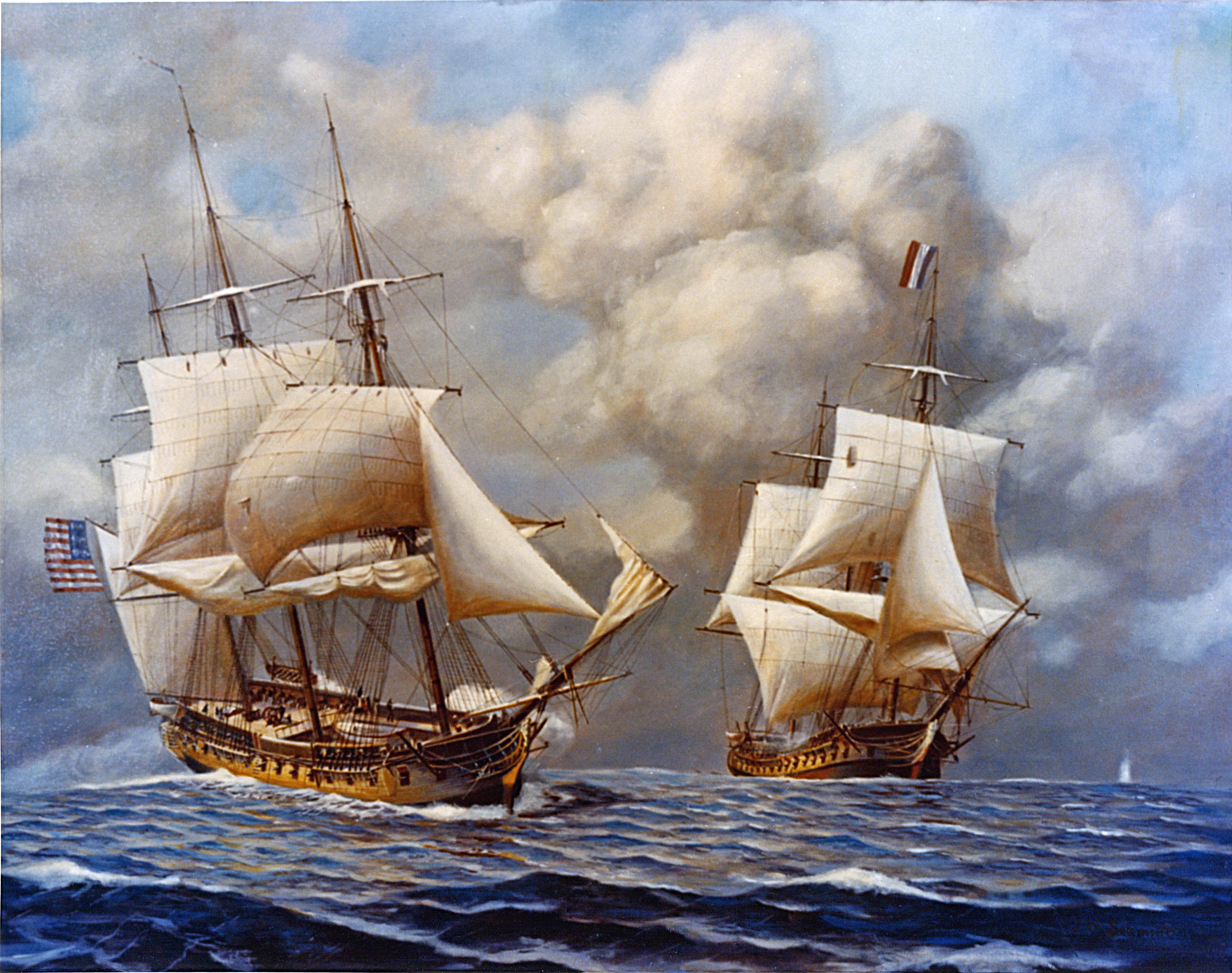
  USS Constellation in combat with French Insurgente
  - 1798
    - Capture of La Croyable
    - Capture of USS Retaliation
- 1799 – 1800 Fries's Rebellion
- August 30, 1800 Gabriel's Rebellion

=== 19th century ===
- 1804 Battle of Sitka
- 1810 – 1813 Tecumseh's War
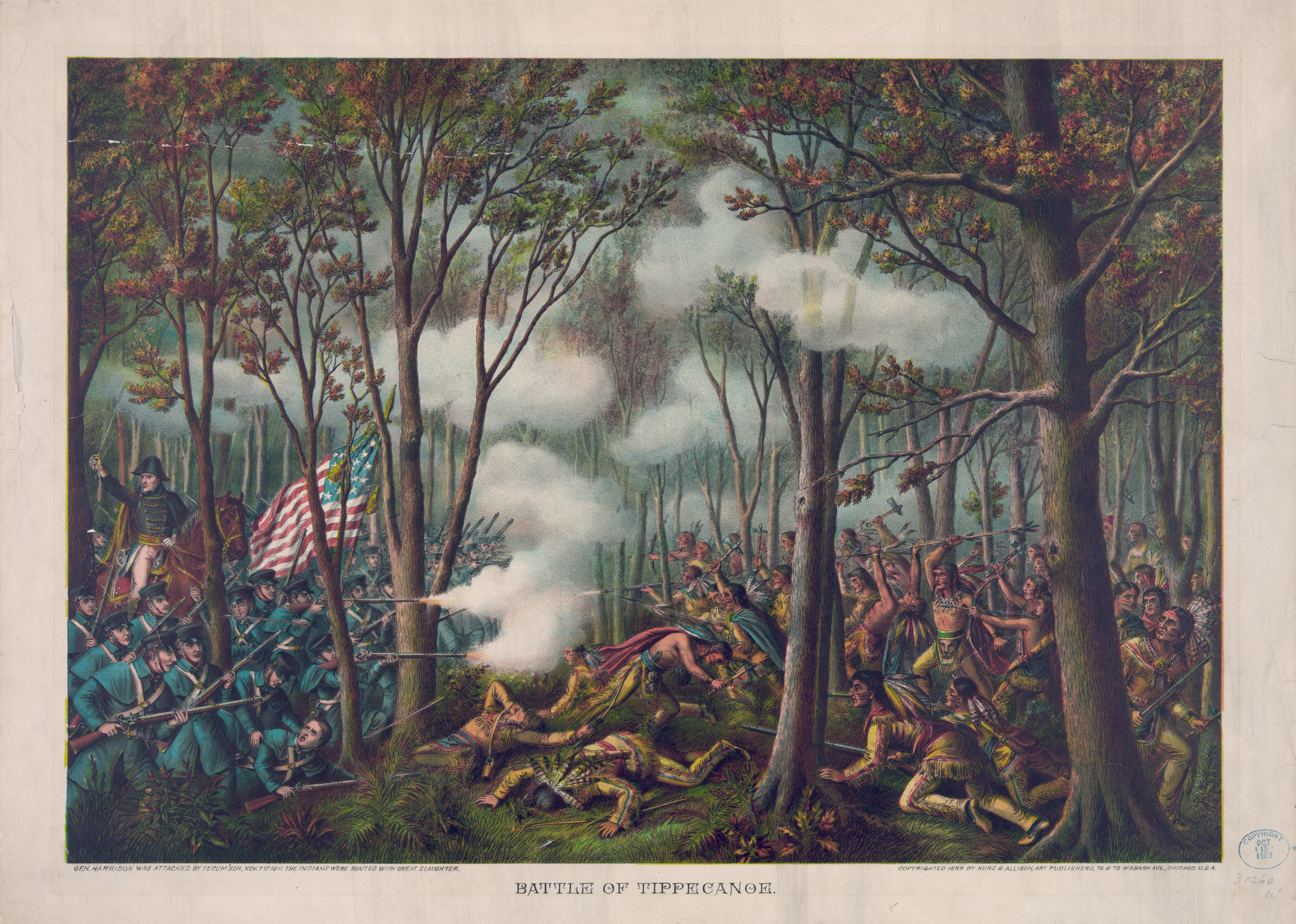
  Battle of Tippecanoe
  - 1811: Battle of Tippecanoe
- 1811: 1811 German Coast uprising
- 1813 Gutiérrez–Magee Expedition (Mexican War of Independence): Battle of Rosillo Creek, Battle of Alazan Creek, Battle of Medina
- 1812 – 1815 War of 1812
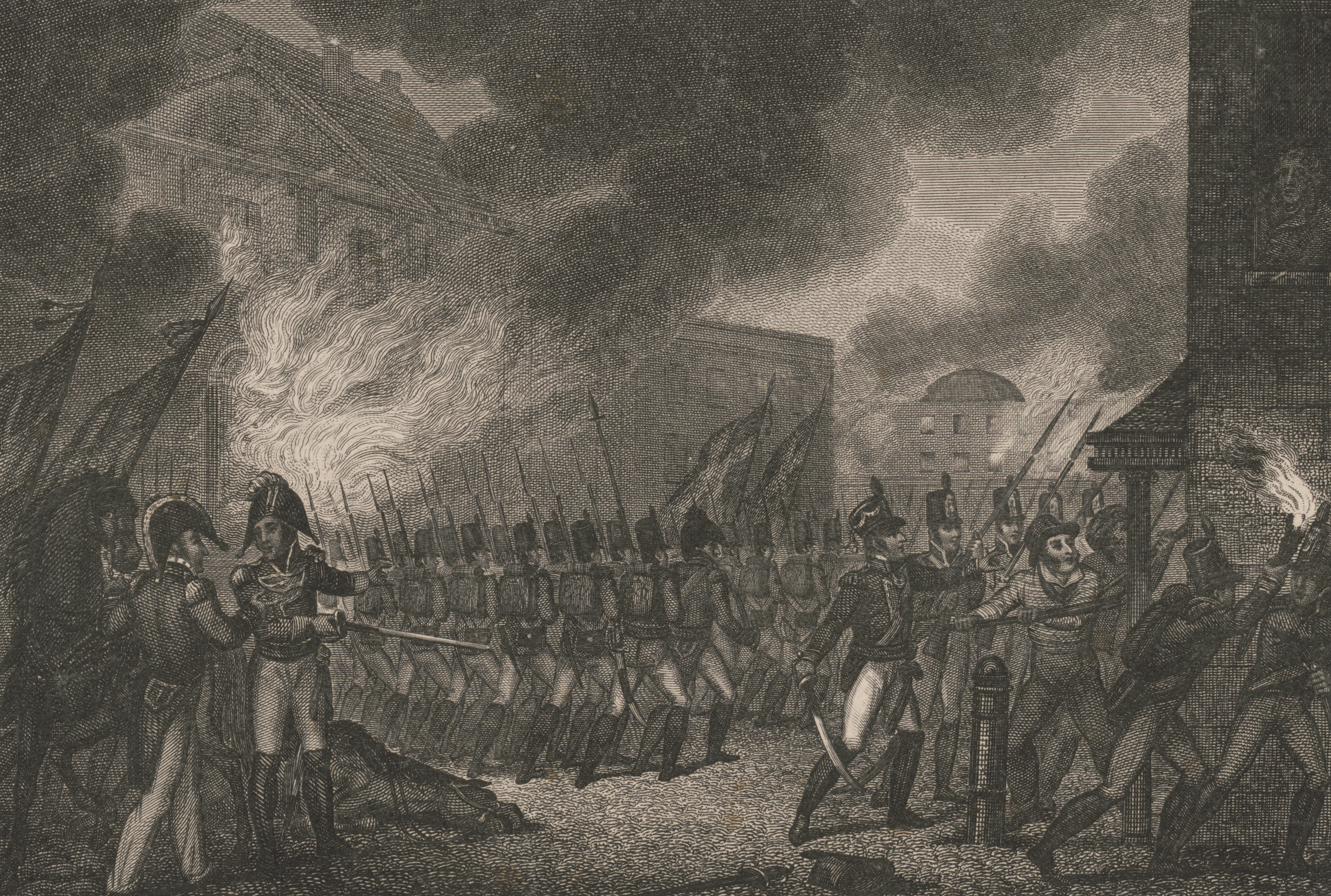
  British troops enter Washington during the burning of Washington.
  - 1812
    - Siege of Fort Mackinac
    - Battle of River Canard
    - First Battle of Sackett's Harbor
    - Battle of Brownstown
    - Battle of Maguaga
    - Battle of Fort Dearborn
    - Siege of Detroit
    - Siege of Fort Harrison
    - Siege of Fort Wayne
    - Battle of Wild Cat Creek
    - Battle of the Mississinewa
  - 1813
    - Battle of Frenchtown
    - Raid on Elizabethtown
    - Battle of Ogdensburg
    - Siege of Fort Meigs
    - Battle of Sackett's Harbor
    - Battle of Craney Island
    - Battle of Fort Stephenson
    - Battle of St. Michaels
    - Battle of Bladensburg
    - Battle of Lake Erie
    - Capture of Fort Niagara
  - 1813
    - Battle of Tipton's Island
    - Battle of Africa Point
    - Raid on Havre de Grace
    - Battle of Craney Island
    - Battle of Fort Stephenson
  - 1814
    - Battle of Longwoods
    - Raid on Fort Oswego
    - Siege of Prairie du Chien
    - Battle of Big Sandy Creek
    - Battle of Rock Island Rapids
    - Battle of Mackinac Island
    - Battle of Bladensburg
    - Burning of Washington
    - Raid on Alexandria (Virginia)
    - Battle of Caulk's Field
    - Battle of North Point
    - Battle of Lake Champlain
    - Battle of Baltimore
    - Battle of Pensacola (1812)
  - 1815
    - Battle of New Orleans
    - Battle of Fort Peter
    - Battle of the Sink Hole
    - Battle of Fort Bowyer
- 1813 – 1814 Creek War
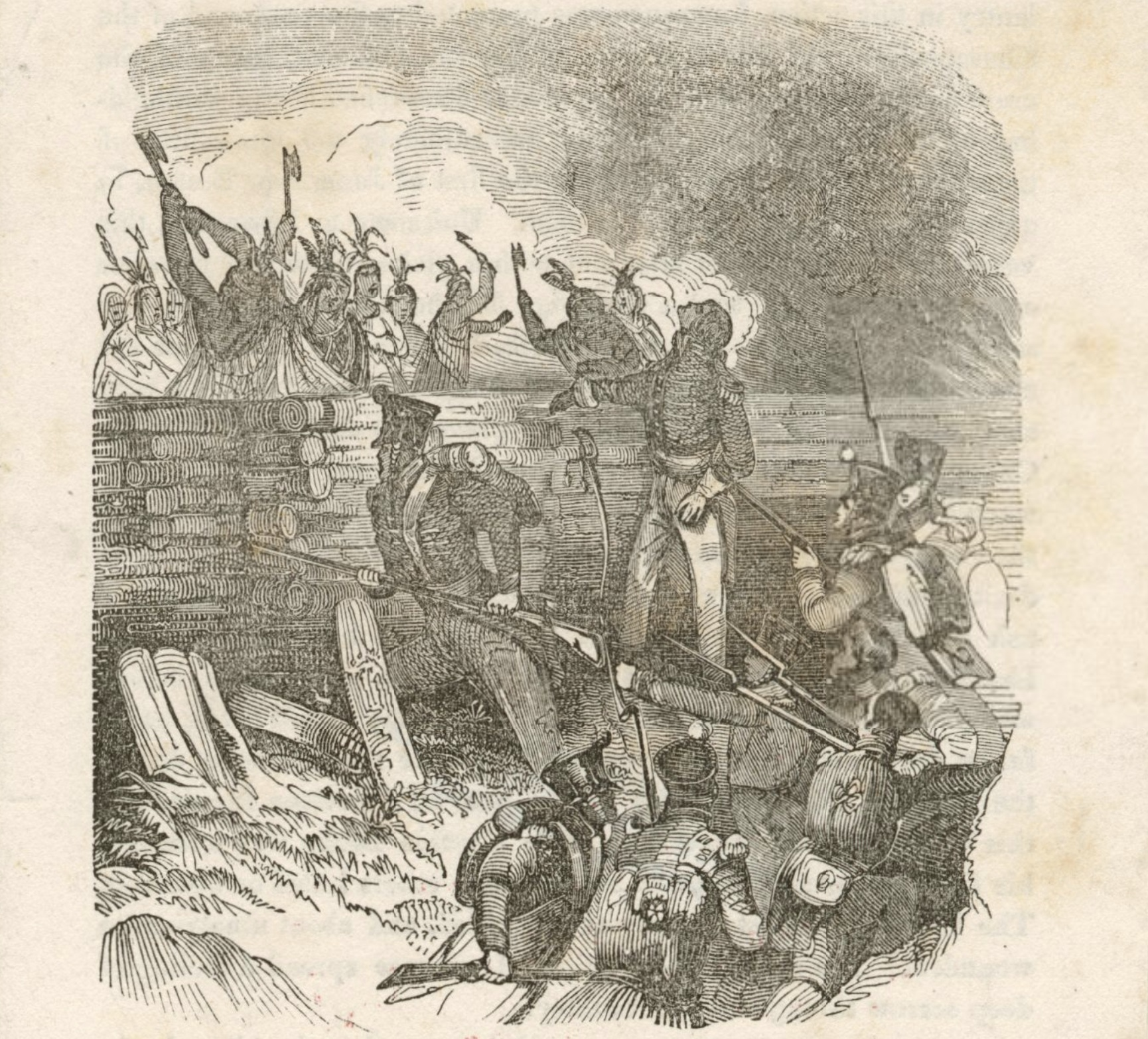
  Battle of Horseshoe Bend
  - 1813
    - Battle of Burnt Corn
    - Fort Mims massacre
    - Bashi Skirmish
    - Battle of Tallushatchee
    - Battle of Talladega
    - Canoe Fight
    - Battle of Autossee
    - Battle of Holy Ground
  - 1814
    - Battle of Calebee Creek
    - Battles of Emuckfaw and Enotachopo Creek
    - Battle of Horseshoe Bend
- 1817 – 1818 First Seminole War
  - July 27, 1816 Battle of Negro Fort
- 1820 – 1875 Texas-Indian wars
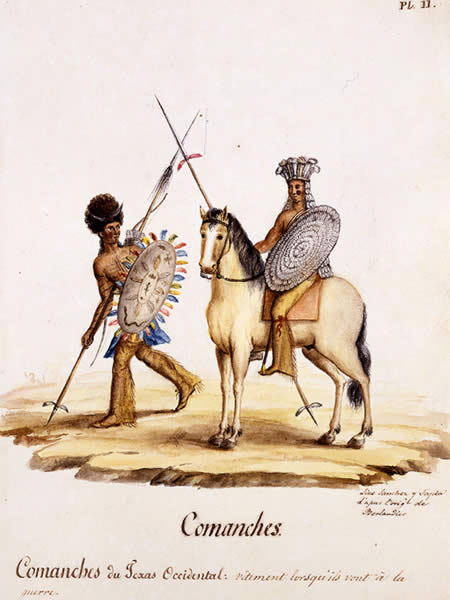
  Comanches of West Texas in war regalia.
  - 1837: Battle of Stone Houses
  - 1838: Arroyo Seco Fight, Killough massacre
  - 1839: Battle of the San Gabriels, Battle of the Neches
  - 1840: Great Raid of 1840
  - 1841: Battle of Village Creek, Battle of Bandera Pass
  - 1854: Battle of the Diablo Mountains
  - 1857: Battle of Devil's River
  - 1872: Battle of the North Fork of the Red River
- 1820 Tongue River Massacre
- 1823 Arikara War
- 1827 Winnebago War
- 1830 – 1847 Indian removal
  - 1830 – 1850 Trail of Tears
  - 1831 – 1833 Choctaw Trail of Tears
  - May 25, 1838 – 1839 Cherokee removal
  - November 4, 1838 Potawatomi Trail of Death
- August 21 – 23, 1831 Nat Turner's Rebellion
- 1832 Black Hawk War
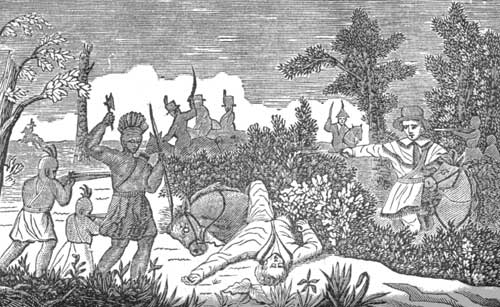
  Battle of Stillman's Run
  - 1832
    - Minor attacks of the Black Hawk War
    - Battle of Stillman's Run
    - Buffalo Grove ambush
    - Plum River raid
    - Indian Creek massacre
    - St. Vrain massacre
    - Attacks at Fort Blue Mounds
    - Spafford Farm massacre
    - Battle of Horseshoe Bend
    - Battle of Waddams Grove
    - Battle of Kellogg's Grove
    - Attack at Ament's Cabin
    - Battle of Apple River Fort
    - Sinsinawa Mound raid
    - Battle of Wisconsin Heights
    - Battle of Bad Axe
- 1833 Cutthroat Gap massacre
- 1835 – 1842 Second Seminole War
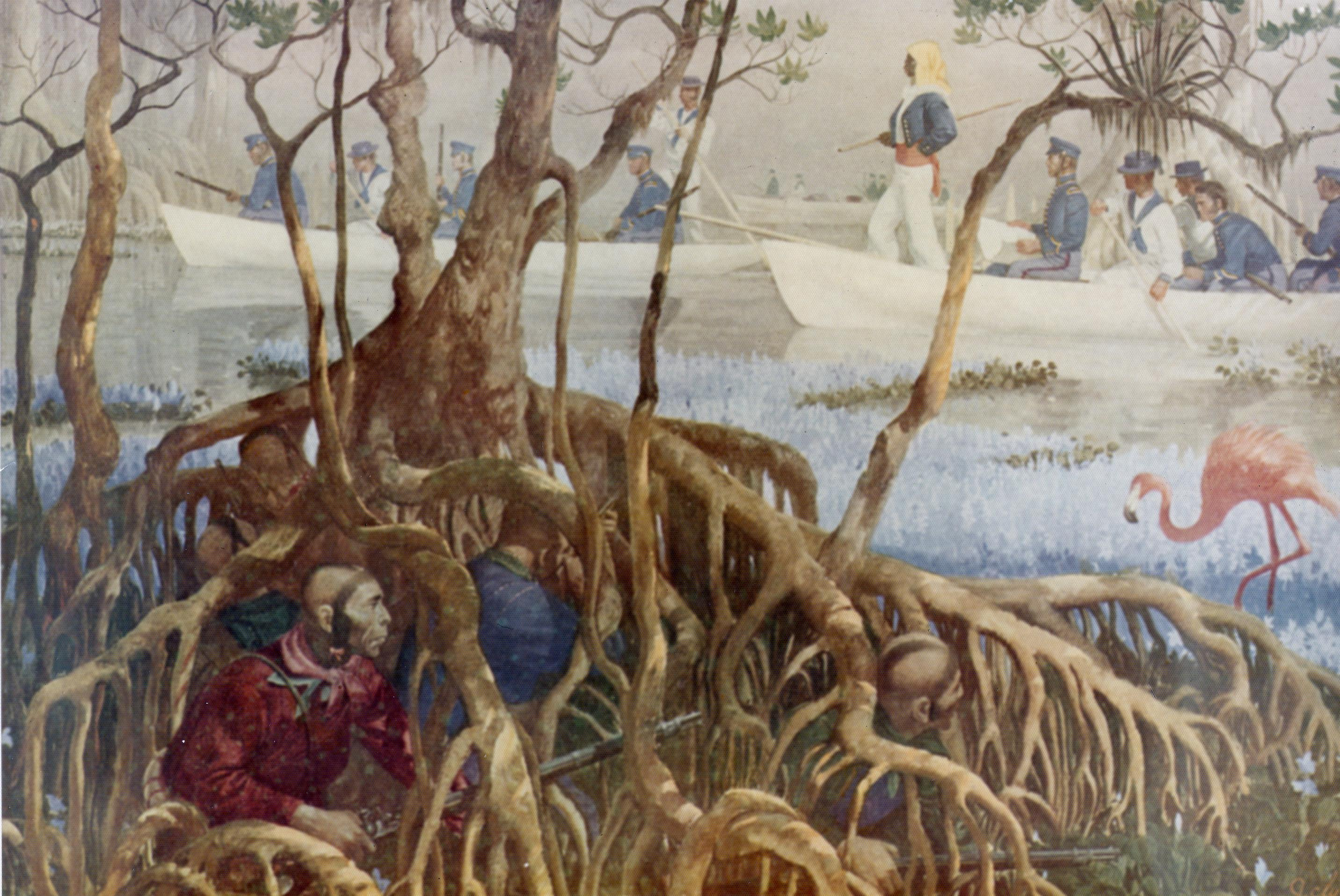
  United States Marines searching for the Indians during the Seminole War.
  - 1835
    - Dade battle
    - Battle of Ouithlacoochie
  - 1836
    - Battle of San Felasco Hammock
    - Battle of Wahoo Swamp
  - 1837: Battle of Lake Okeechobee
  - 1838
    - Battles of the Loxahatchee
    - Battle of Pine Island Ridge
  - 1839: Battle of the Caloosahatchee
- 1835 – 1836 Toledo War
- 1835 – 1836 Texas Revolution
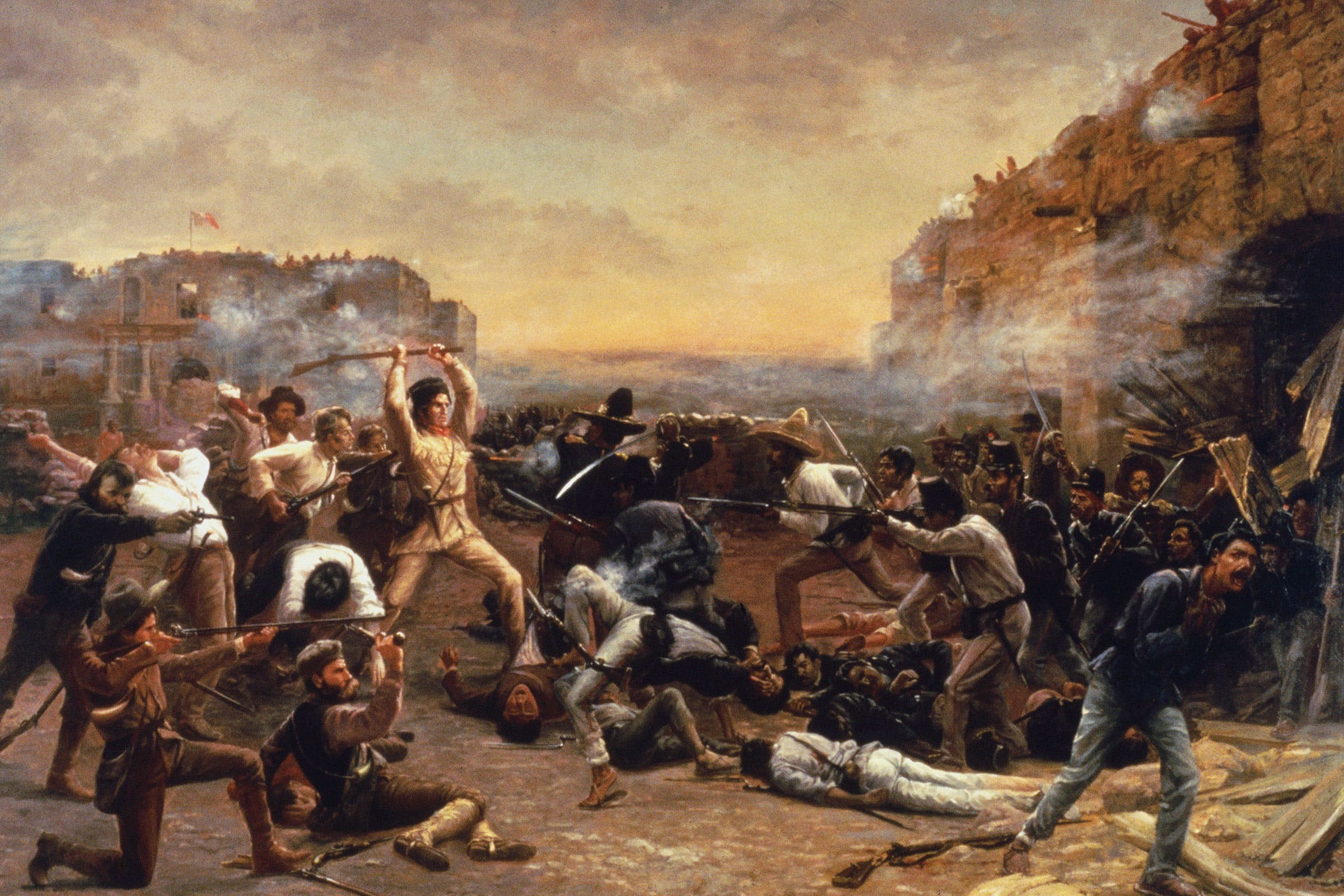
  Battle of the Alamo
  - 1835
    - San Felipe incident
    - Battle of Gonzales
    - Battle of Goliad
    - Battle of Lipantitlán
    - Battle of Concepción
    - Grass Fight
    - Siege of Béxar
  - 1836
    - Battle of San Patricio
    - Battle of Agua Dulce
    - Battle of the Alamo
    - Battle of Refugio
    - Battle of Coleto
    - Goliad massacre
    - Battle of San Jacinto
- 1836 – 1875 Comanche Wars
  - 1836: Fort Parker massacre
  - 1840: Council House Fight, Battle of Plum Creek
  - 1858: Antelope Hills expedition, Battle of Little Robe Creek
  - 1860: Battle of Pease River
  - 1864: First Battle of Adobe Walls
- 1836 – 1837 Creek War of 1836
  - March 27, 1837 Battle of Pea River
- 1838 – 1839 Aroostook War
- 1838 Mormon War (1838)
  - October 24, 1838 Battle of Crooked River
- 1838 – 1839 Córdova Rebellion
- 1839 Honey War
- 1839 – 1845 Anti-Rent War
- 1839 – 1844 Regulator–Moderator War
- 1840 Bellevue War
- 1841 – 1842 Dorr Rebellion
- 1842 Dawson Massacre
- 1842 – 1843 Mier expedition
- 1844 – 1850 Tutt–Everett War
- May 6 – July 7, 1844 Philadelphia nativist riots
- 1844 – 1846 Battle of Nauvoo
- 1845 Milwaukee Bridge War
- 1846 – 1887 California Indian Wars
  - 1846 – 1873 California genocide
- 1846 – 1848 Mexican–American War
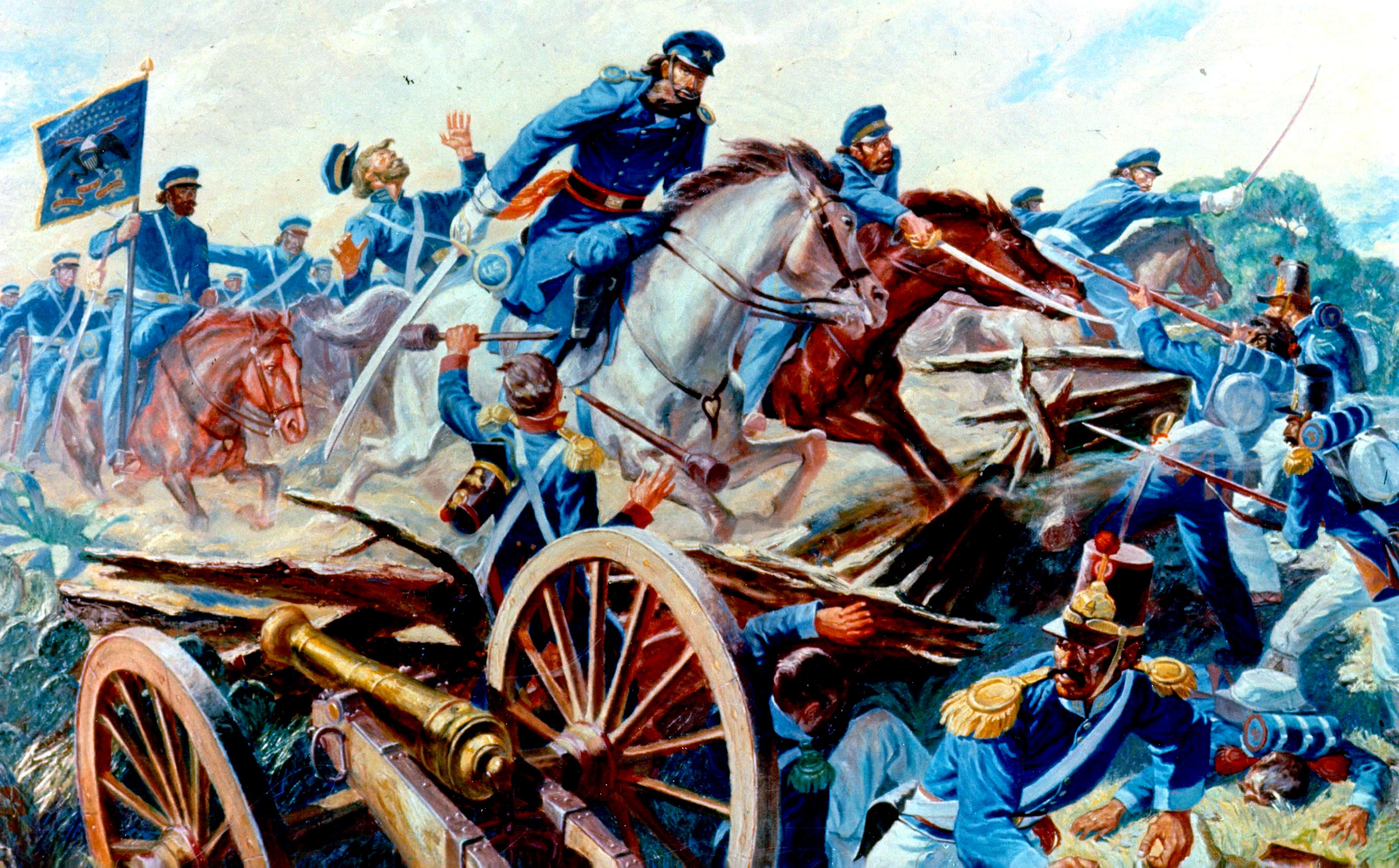
  Battle of Resaca de la Palma
  - 1846
    - Texas Campaign: Thornton Affair, Siege of Fort Texas, Battle of Palo Alto, Battle of Resaca de la Palma
    - Conquest of California: Battle of Olómpali, Battle of Monterey, Battle of Yerba Buena, Capture of Santa Fe, Siege of Los Angeles, Battle of Chino, Battle of Dominguez Rancho, Battle of Natividad, Battle of San Pasqual
    - Battle of El Brazito
    - Capture of Tucson
  - 1847
    - Conquest of California: Battle of La Mesa, Battle of Río San Gabriel, Battle of Santa Clara
    - Taos Revolt
    - Battle of Cañada
    - First Battle of Mora
    - Battle of Embudo Pass
    - Second Battle of Mora
    - Siege of Pueblo de Taos
- 1847 – 1855 Cayuse War
  - November 29, 1847 Whitman massacre
- 1849 – 1866 Navajo Wars
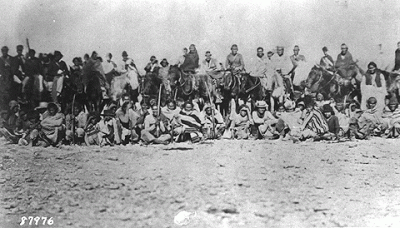
  Navajo people photographed during the Long Walk.
  - 1860: Second Battle of Fort Defiance
  - 1864
    - Battle of Pecos River
    - Battle of Canyon de Chelly
    - Long Walk of the Navajo
- 1849 – 1924 Apache Wars
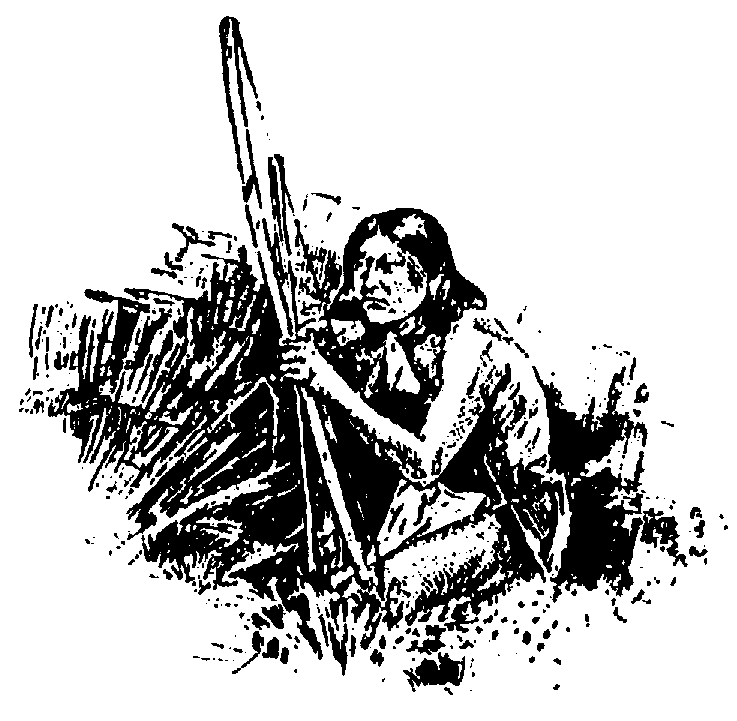
  Drawing of an Apache warrior waiting for an ambush.
  - 1857
    - Battle of Cooke's Spring
    - Bonneville Expedition (1857)
  - 1860: Battle of the Mimbres River
  - 1861
    - Siege of Tubac
    - Battle of Cookes Canyon
    - Battle of the Florida Mountains
    - Gallinas massacre
    - Battle of Placito
    - Battle of Pinos Altos
  - 1862
    - First Battle of Dragoon Springs
    - Second Battle of Dragoon Springs
    - Battle of Apache Pass
  - 1863: Mowry massacres
  - 1864
    - Battle of Mount Gray
    - Skirmish in Doubtful Canyon
  - 1865: Battle of Fort Buchanan
- 1849 – 1855 Jicarilla War
  - 1849: White massacre
  - 1854
    - Battle of Cieneguilla
    - Battle of Ojo Caliente Canyon
- 1850 – 1853 Yuma War
  - 1850 Gila Expedition
  - 8 February – October 1852 Yuma Expedition
- February 8 – 17, 1850 Battle at Fort Utah
- 1850 – 1851 Mariposa War
- 1853 – 1854 Walker War
  - October 2, 1853 Nephi massacre
- 1854 – 1858 Bleeding Kansas
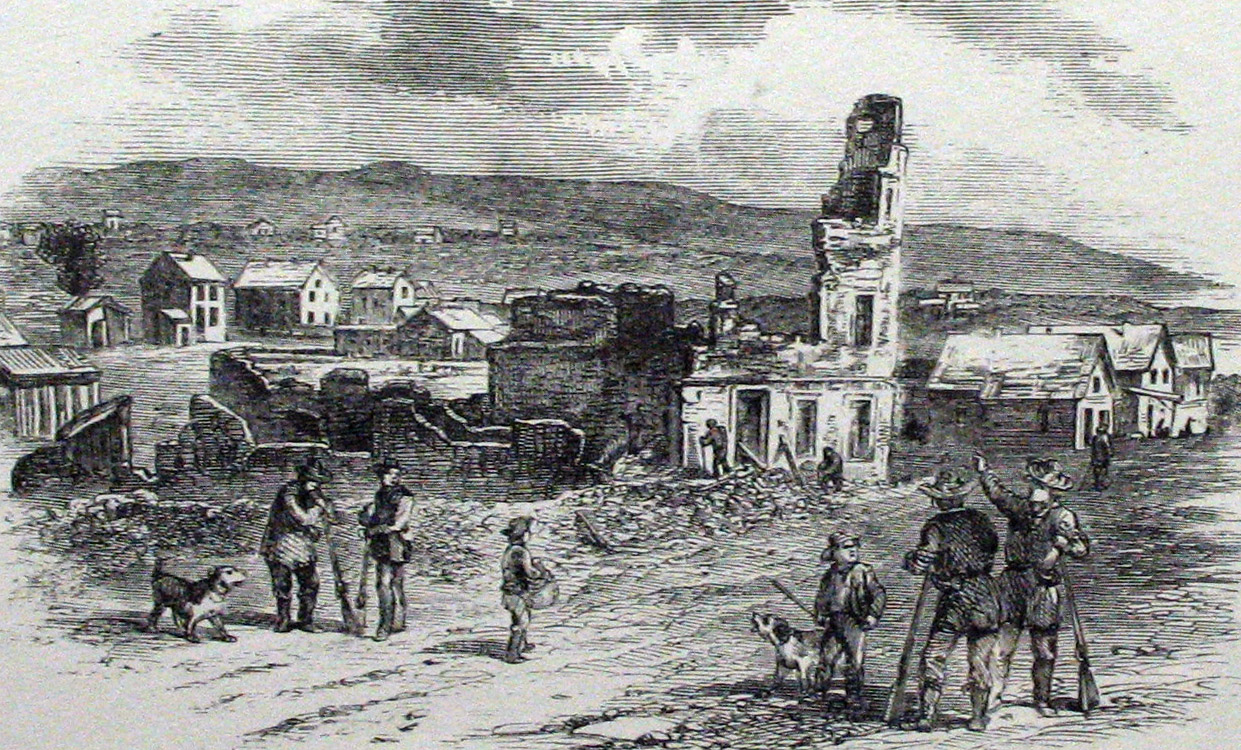
  Aftermath of the Sacking of Lawrence.
  - 1855: Wakarusa War
  - 1856
    - Sacking of Lawrence
    - Pottawatomie massacre
    - Battle of Black Jack
    - Battle of Fort Titus
    - Battle of Osawatomie
- 1854 – 1855: First Sioux War
  - August 19, 1854 Grattan massacre
  - September 3, 1855 Battle of Ash Hollow
- 1855 – 1856: Rogue River Wars
  - October 31, 1855 Battle of Hungry Hill
  - May 27 – 28, 1856 Battle of Big Bend
- 1855 – 1858: Yakima War
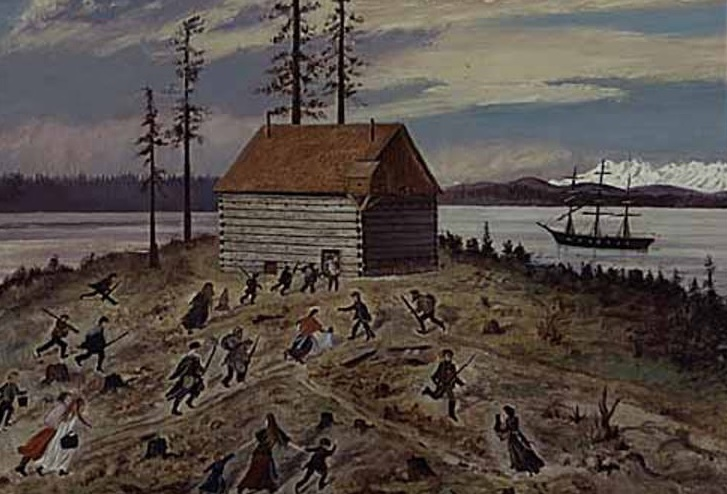
  Seattleites evacuate to the town blockhouse.
  - 1855
    - Battle of Toppenish Creek
    - Battle of Union Gap
    - Battle of Walla Walla
  - 1856: Battle of Seattle (1856)
  - 1858
    - Coeur d'Alene War
    - Battle of Pine Creek
    - Battle of Four Lakes
    - Battle of Spokane Plains
- 1855 – 1856 Puget Sound War
  - 1856: Battle of Port Gamble
- 1855 – 1858 Third Seminole War
- 1855 Klamath River Wars
- 1856 Tule River War
- 1856 Tintic War
- 1857 – 1858 Utah War
  - September 7 – 11, 1857 Mountain Meadows massacre
  - November 25 – 28, 1857 Aiken massacre (Utah)
- July 4 – 5, 1857 Dead Rabbits riot
- 1858 – 1859 Mohave War
- 1858 – 1864 Bald Hills War
- 1859 Pitt River Expedition
- 1859 – 1860 Mendocino War
- 1859 Pig War (1859)
- 1859 – 1861 Cortina Troubles
  - 1859
    - Brownsville Raid (1859)
    - Battle of La Ebonal
    - Battle of Rio Grande City
  - 1860
    - Battle of La Bolsa
  - 1861
    - Battle of Carrizo
- 1859 John Brown's raid on Harpers Ferry
- 1860 Paiute War
  - May 7, 1860 Williams Station massacre
  - May 13, 1860 First Battle of Pyramid Lake
  - June 2 – 4, 1860 Second Battle of Pyramid Lake
- 1860 Bitter Spring Expedition
- 1861 – 1865 American Civil War
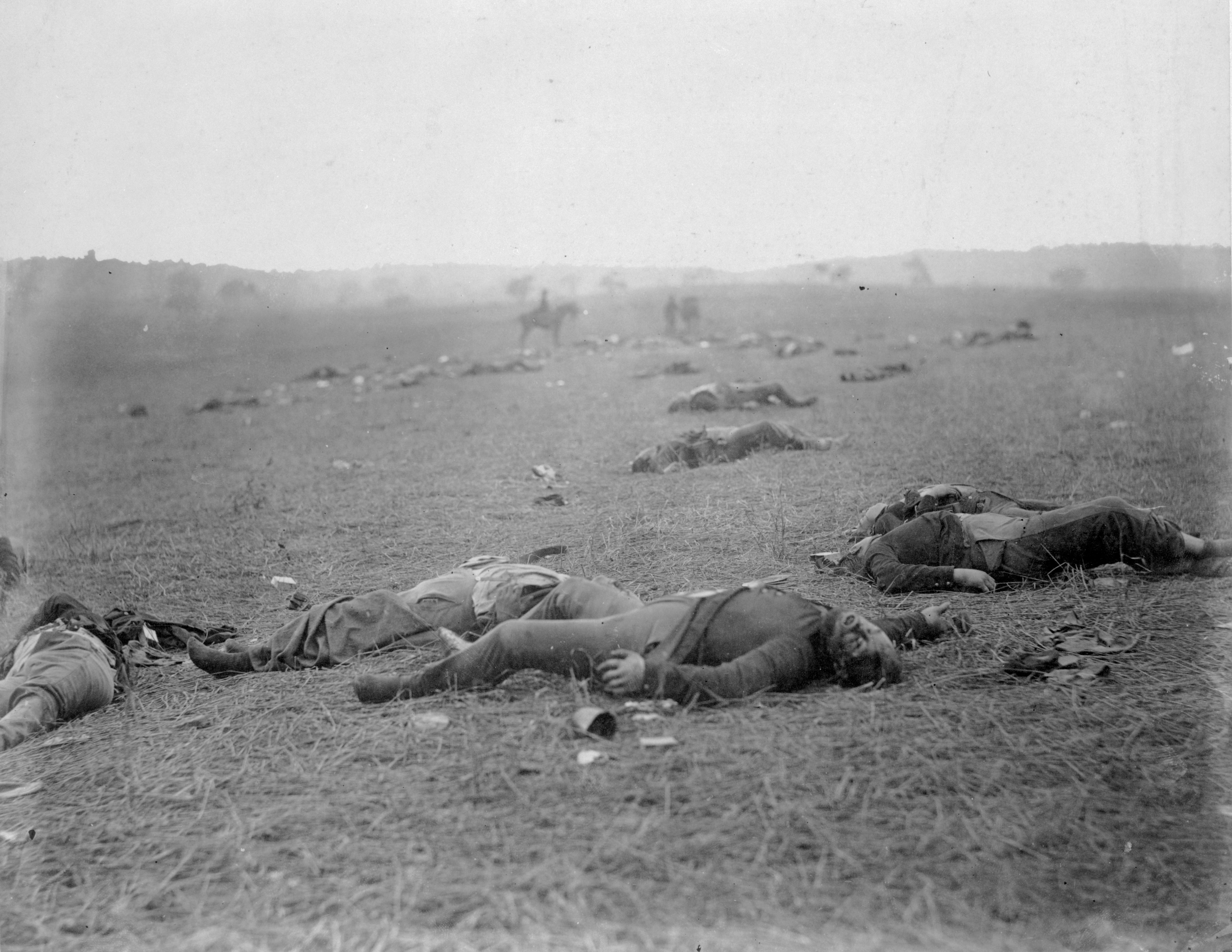
  General Pickett's Charge during the Battle of Gettysburg.
  - 1861
    - Battle of Fort Sumter
    - Battle of Philippi (West Virginia)
    - Battle of Big Bethel
    - Battle of Cole Camp
    - First Battle of Mesilla
    - Battle of Rich Mountain
    - First Battle of Bull Run
    - Battle of Wilson's Creek
    - Battle of Dry Wood Creek
    - Battle of Barbourville
    - Battle of Ball's Bluff
    - Battle of Rowlett's Station
    - Battle of Mount Zion Church
  - 1862
    - Battle of Roan's Tan Yard
    - Battle of Mill Springs
    - Battle of Roanoke Island
    - Battle of Fort Donelson
    - Battle of Pea Ridge
    - Battle of Hampton Roads
    - Battle of Shiloh
    - Battle of Island Number 10
    - Battle of Valverde
    - Battle of Glorieta Pass
    - Battle of Albuquerque
    - Battle of Peralta
    - Battle of Fair Oaks
    - First Battle of Memphis
    - Battle of Cross Keys
    - Battle of Port Republic
    - Seven Days' Battles
    - Battle of Savage's Station
    - Battle of Baton Rouge (1862)
    - Battle of Cedar Mountain
    - Second Battle of Bull Run
    - Battle of Antietam
    - Battle of Coffeeville
    - Battle of Fredericksburg
    - Battle of Kinston
    - Battle of Chickasaw Bayou
    - Battle of Stones River
    - Battle of Hartville
    - Battle of Deserted House
    - Skirmish at Threkeld's Ferry
    - Battle of Kelly's Ford
    - Battle of Vaught's Hill
    - Battle of Brentwood
    - Battle of Somerset
    - Battle of Newton's Station
    - Battle of Chancellorsville
    - Battle of Port Gibson
    - Siege of Vicksburg
    - Battle of Portland Harbor
    - Battle of Gettysburg
    - Battle of Helena
    - Battle of Honey Springs
    - Battle of Buffington Island
    - Battle of Chickamauga
    - Third Battle of Chattanooga
    - Knoxville Campaign
  - 1864
    - Battle of Loudoun Heights
    - Battle of Dandridge
    - Battle of Morton's Ford
    - Battle of Olustee
    - Battle of Okolona
    - Battle of Rio Hill
    - Battle of Walkerton
    - Battle of Laredo
    - Battle of Paducah
    - Battle of the Wilderness
    - Battle of Port Walthall Junction
    - Siege of Atlanta
    - Battle of Spotsylvania
    - Battle of Resaca
    - Battle of North Anna
    - Battle of Wilson's Wharf
    - Battle of Cold Harbor
    - Battle of Marietta
    - Battle of Trevilian Station
    - Siege of Petersburg
    - Battle of Kennesaw Mountain
    - Battle of Peachtree Creek
    - Battle of Atlanta
    - Battle of the Crater
    - Battle of Mobile Bay
    - Battle of Utoy Creek
    - Battle of Jonesborough
    - Battle of Vernon
    - Battle of Griswoldville
    - Battle of Buck Head Creek
    - Battle of Franklin
    - Battle of Honey Hill
    - Battle of Nashville
    - Battle of Anthony's Hill
  - 1865
    - Battle of Dove Creek
    - Battle of Natural Bridge
    - Battle of Bentonville
    - Battle of Lewis's Farm
    - Battle of Dinwiddie Court House
    - Battle of Five Forks
    - Third Battle of Petersburg
    - Battle of Namozine Church
    - Battle of Amelia Springs
    - Battle of Rice's Station
    - Battle of Cumberland Church
    - Battle of Appomattox Court House
- 1861 – 1875 Yavapai Wars
- 1862 – 1867 Bitter Spring Expedition
- 1862 Morrisite War
- 1862 Dakota War of 1862
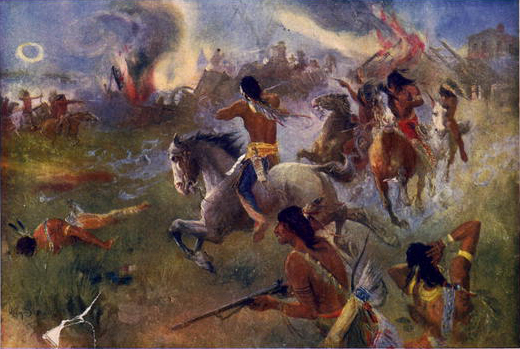
  The Siege of New Ulm
  - 1862
    - Attack at the Lower Sioux Agency
    - Battle of Redwood Ferry
    - Battles of New Ulm
    - Lake Shetek massacre
    - Battle of Fort Ridgely
    - Battle of Birch Coulee
    - Battle of Acton
    - Attack on Forest City
    - Attack on Hutchinson
    - Battle of Wood Lake
- 1863 – 1891 Hatfield-McCoy Feud
- 1863 Bear River Massacre
- July 13 – 16, 1863 New York City draft riots
- 1864 – 1868 Snake War
  - 1865
    - Battle of Mud Lake
  - 1866
    - Battle of Owyhee River
  - 1867
    - Battle of Steen's Mountain
    - Battle of Infernal Caverns
- 1864 – 1865 Colorado War
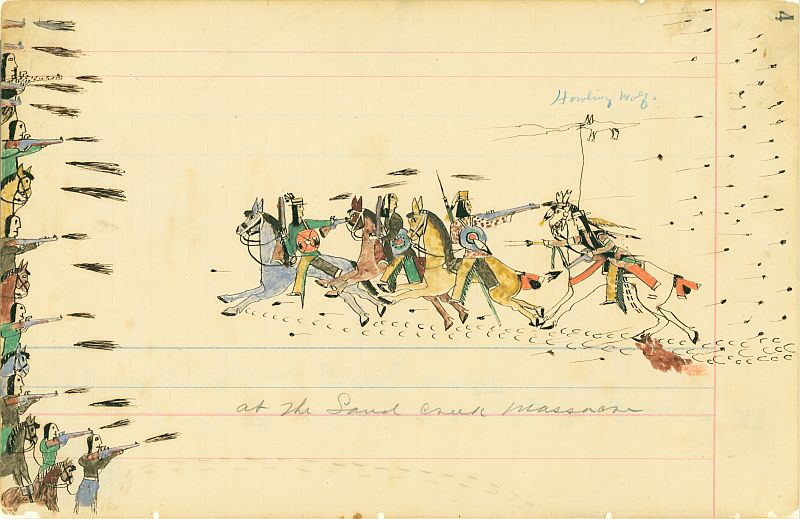
  Sand Creek massacre
  - 1864
    - Sand Creek massacre
  - 1865
    - Battle of Julesburg
    - American Ranch massacre
    - Raid on Godfrey Ranch
    - Battle of Mud Springs
    - Battle of Rush Creek
    - Battle of Platte Bridge
- 1864 – 1874 Lowry War
- 1865 – 1959 Oyster Wars
- 1865 – 1870 Hualapai War
- 1865 – 1872 Black Hawk War (1865–1872)
  - April 21, 1866 Circleville Massacre
- 1865 Powder River Expedition (1865)
  - 1865
    - Battle of Bone Pile Creek
    - Powder River Massacre
    - Battle of the Tongue River
    - Sawyers Fight
    - Powder River Battles (1865)
- 1866 – 1868 Red Cloud's War
  - December 21, 1866 Fetterman Fight
  - August 1, 1867 Hayfield Fight
  - August 2, 1867 Wagon Box Fight
- 1866 – 1871 Fenian raids
- May 1 – 3, 1866 Memphis massacre of 1866
- July 30, 1866 New Orleans massacre of 1866
- 1867 – 1875 Comanche campaign
  - 1871
    - Warren Wagon Train raid
    - Battle of Blanco Canyon
  - 1874: Battle of Palo Duro Canyon
- 1868 – 1876 Sutton–Taylor feud
- January 7, 1868 Pulaski riot
- September 28, 1868 Opelousas massacre
- 1868 Battle of the Washita River
- 1870 Barber–Mizell feud
- July – November 1870 Kirk–Holden war
- 1871 – 1875 Yavapai War
  - 1871
    - Camp Grant massacre
    - Wickenburg massacre
  - 1872: Battle of Salt River Canyon
  - 1873: Battle of Turret Peak
  - 1874: Battle of Sunset Pass
- April 15, 1872 Goingsnake massacre
- 1872 – 1873 Modoc War
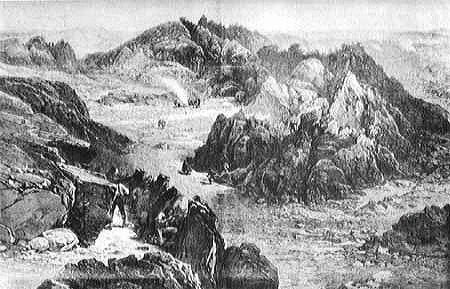
  Modocs defending their Stronghold.
  - 1872: Battle of Lost River
  - 1873
    - First Battle of the Stronghold
    - Second Battle of the Stronghold
    - Battle of Sand Butte
    - Battle of Dry Lake
- March 1871 Meridian race riot of 1871
- October 24, 1871 Los Angeles Chinese massacre of 1871
- 1873 – 1888 Colfax County War
- 1873 Yellowstone Expedition of 1873
  - 1873
    - Battle of Honsinger Bluff
    - Battle of Pease Bottom
- 1873: Colfax massacre
- 1874 – 1875 Red River War
  - June 28, 1874 Second Battle of Adobe Walls
  - September 9 – 14, 1874 Battle of the Upper Washita River
    - September 9 – 14, 1874 Battle of Lyman's Wagon Train
    - September 12, 1874 Battle of Buffalo Wallow
  - September 28, 1874 Battle of Palo Duro Canyon
- 1874 Brooks–Baxter War
- 1874 Battle of Liberty Place
- November 3, 1874 Election Massacre of 1874
- December 7, 1874 – January 5, 1875 Vicksburg massacre
- 1875 – 1876 Mason County War
- 1875 Las Cuevas War
- 1876 Hamburg massacre
- 1876 – 1877 Great Sioux War of 1876
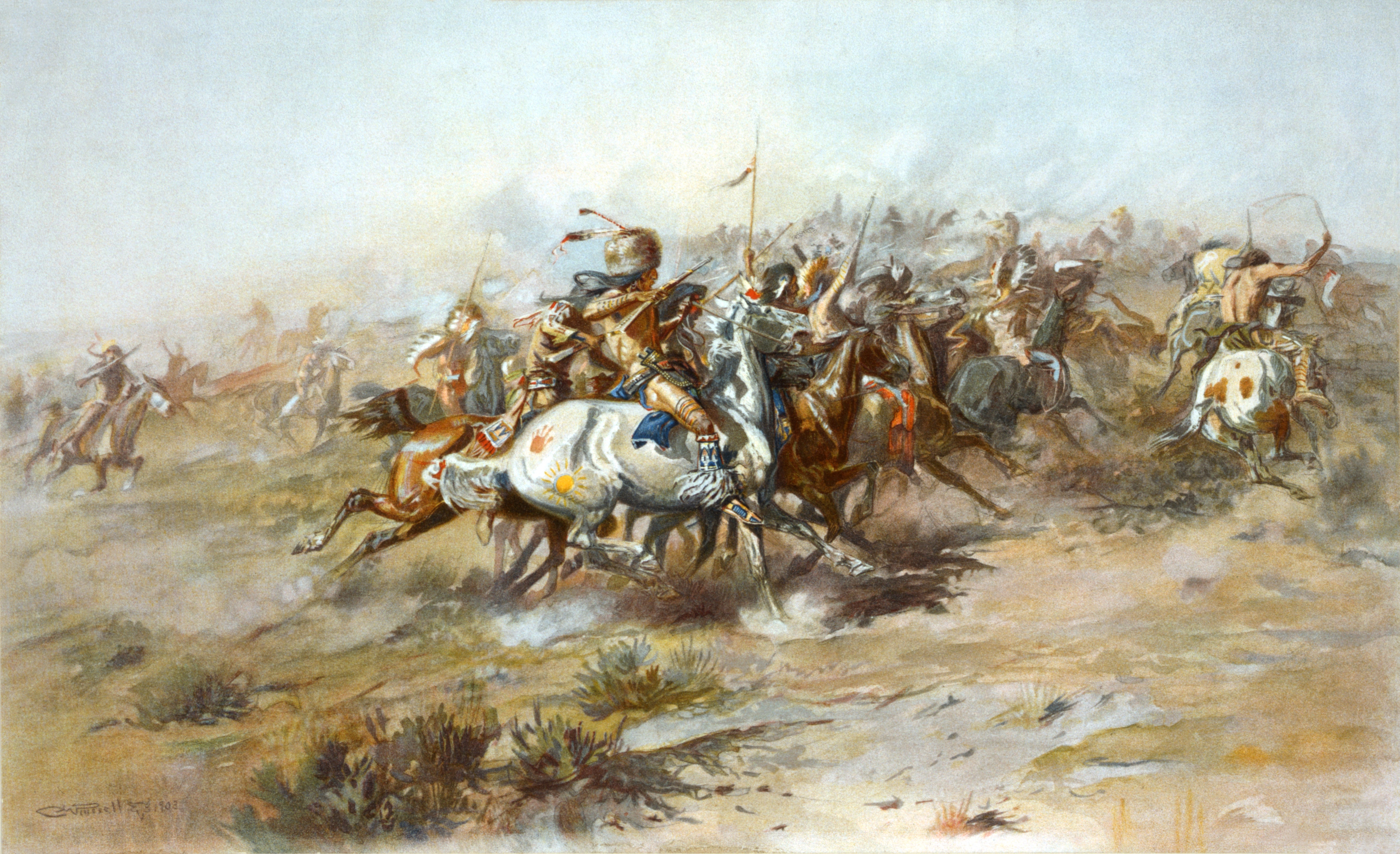
  Battle of Little Bighorn
  - 1876
    - Big Horn Expedition
    - Battle of Powder River
    - Battle of Prairie Dog Creek
    - Battle of the Rosebud
    - Battle of the Little Bighorn
    - Battle of Warbonnet Creek
    - Battle of Slim Buttes
    - Battle of Cedar Creek (1876)
    - Dull Knife Fight
  - 1877
    - Battle of Wolf Mountain
    - Battle of Little Muddy Creek
- 1876 – 1877 Buffalo Hunters' War
  - 1877
    - Buffalo Soldier tragedy of 1877
    - Battle of Yellow House Canyon
- 1877 Nez Perce War
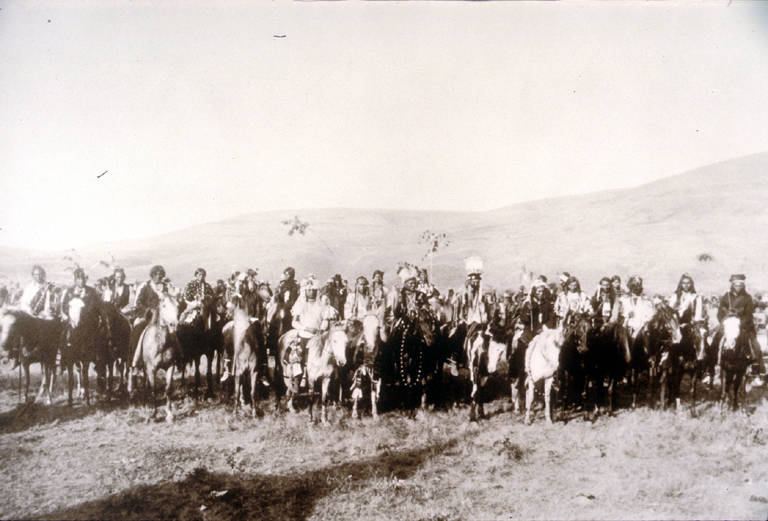
  Chief Joseph and his band in the spring of 1877.
  - 1877
    - Battle of White Bird Canyon
    - Battle of Cottonwood
    - Battle of the Clearwater
    - Battle of the Big Hole
    - Battle of Camas Creek
    - Battle of Canyon Creek
    - Attack on Looking Glass camp
    - Battle of Bear Paw
- July 14 – September 4, 1877 Great Railroad Strike of 1877
  - July 16 – 29, 1877 Baltimore railroad strike of 1877
  - July 23 – 26, 1877 Chicago railroad strike of 1877
  - July 19 – 30, 1877 Pittsburgh railroad strike of 1877
  - July 23, 1877 Reading Railroad Massacre
  - July 22 – 28, 1877 1877 St. Louis general strike
  - July 23 – November 17, 1877 Scranton general strike
  - July 24 – 26, 1877 1877 Shamokin uprising
- 1878 Bannock War
- 1878 – 1890 Lincoln County War
  - July 15 – 19, 1878 Battle of Lincoln (1878)
- 1878 – 1879 Northern Cheyenne Exodus
  - September 13 – 14, 1878 Battle of Turkey Springs
  - September 27, 1878 Battle of Punished Woman's Fork
- 1879 Sheepeater Indian War
- 1879 – 1880 Victorio's War
  - 1880: Battle of Hembrillo Basin, Alma Massacre, Battle of Fort Tularosa
  - 1881: Battle of Carrizo Canyon
- 1879 Meeker Massacre
- 1881 – 1886 Geronimo's War
  - 1881
    - Battle of Cibecue Creek
    - Battle of Fort Apache
  - 1882
    - Battle of Big Dry Wash
  - 1885
    - Battle of Devil's Creek
    - Battle of Little Dry Creek
  - 1886
    - Raid on Bear Valley
- 1881 Gunfight at the O.K. Corral
- 1882 – 1892 Pleasant Valley War
- June 1883 Dodge City War
- March 28 – 30, 1884 Cincinnati riots of 1884
- September 2, 1885 Rock Springs massacre
- May 4, 1886 Haymarket affair
- May 5, 1886 Bay View massacre
- 1887 – 1893 Gray County War
- 1887 Crow War
- May 27 – 28, 1887 Hells Canyon Massacre
- 1887 – 1924 Post-1887 Apache Wars period
  - 1889
    - Kelvin Grade massacre
  - 1890
    - Cherry Creek campaign
  - 1896
    - Apache Campaign (1896)
- 1887 Reservoir war
- 1887 – 1895 Hawaiian rebellions (1887–1895)
  - 1889
    - Wilcox rebellion of 1889
  - 1893
    - Overthrow of the Hawaiian Kingdom
    - Leper War on Kauaʻi
    - Black Week (Hawaii)
  - 1895
    - 1895 Wilcox rebellion
- November 22 – 25, 1887 Thibodaux massacre
- 1888 – 1889 Jaybird–Woodpecker War
- 1889 Wham Paymaster robbery
- May 18 – 19, 1889 1889 Forrest City riot
- July 20, 1889 – May 24, 1893 Johnson County War
  - April 11 – 13, 1892 Siege of the TA Ranch
  - June 17, 1892 Battle of Suggs
- 1890 – 1916 Castaic Range War
- 1890 – 1891 Ghost Dance War
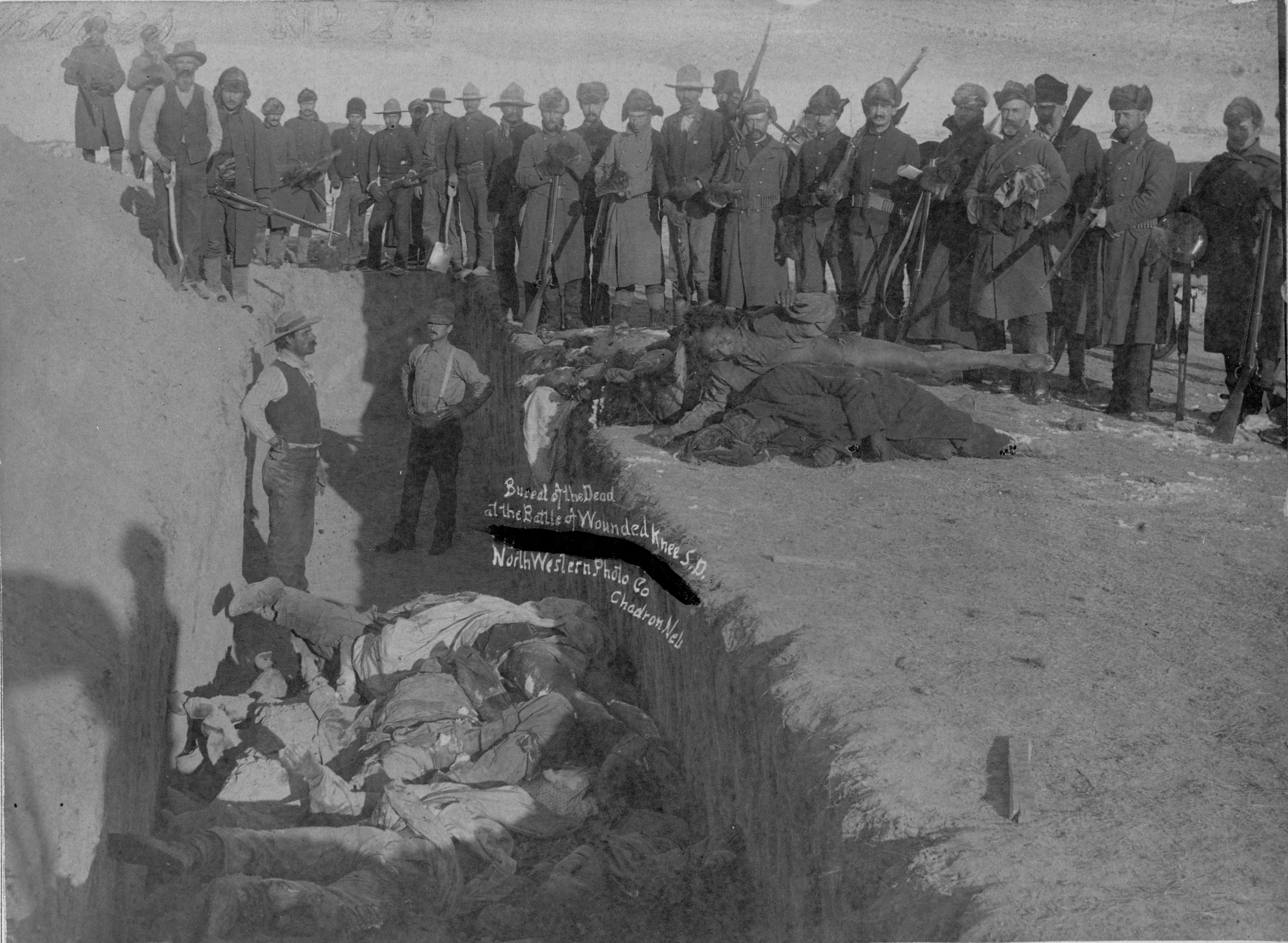
  Mass grave for the dead Lakota after the massacre at Wounded Knee.
  - 1890
    - Wounded Knee Massacre
    - Drexel Mission Fight
- February 10 – May 26, 1891 Morewood massacre
- March 14, 1891 1891 New Orleans lynchings
- April 1891 – August 1892 Coal Creek War
- 1891 – 1893 Garza Revolution
- July 1 – November 20, 1892 Homestead Strike
- 1892 Battle of Coffeyville
- 1893 Battle of Ingalls
- May 1, 1894 May Day riots of 1894
- May 11 – July 20, 1894 Pullman Strike
- 1894 Bituminous coal miners' strike of 1894
- 1895 Bannock War of 1895
- August 4 – 5, 1895 Spring Valley Race Riot of 1895
- 1896 Yaqui Uprising
- September 10, 1897 Lattimer massacre
- 1898 Spanish–American War
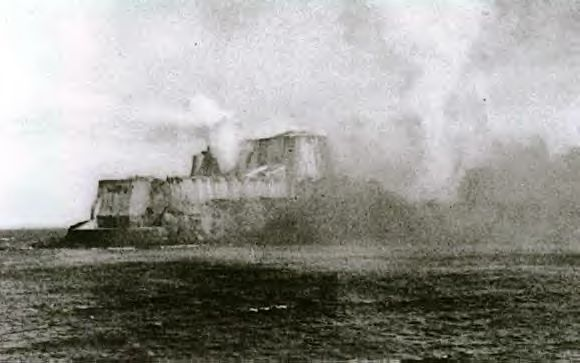
  The bombardment of Castillo San Felipe del Morro.
  - 1898
    - Bombardment of San Juan
    - Capture of Guam
    - Second Battle of San Juan (1898)
    - Third Battle of San Juan (1898)
    - Battle of Fajardo
- 1898 Battle of Sugar Point
- October 12, 1898 Battle of Virden
- November 10, 1898 Wilmington massacre
- 1899 Hot Springs gunfight, Padre Canyon incident
- April 10, 1899 Pana massacre
- September 17, 1899 Carterville Mine Riot

== Contemporary history ==
=== 20th Century ===
This covers conflicts and terrorist attacks in the 1900s that occurred within the modern territory of the United States of America. This also includes attacks upon the United States from Eurasian powers.

==== 1900–1945 ====
- July 23 – 28, 1900 Robert Charles riots
- May 12 – October 23, 1902 Anthracite coal strike of 1902
- 1903 – 1904 Colorado Labor Wars
- July 6 – 10, 1903 Evansville race riot
- April 7 – July 19, 1905 1905 Chicago teamsters' strike
- 1906 – 1916 Porum Range War
- June 1, 1906 Cananea strike
- August 12 – 13, 1906 Brownsville affair
- September 22 – 24, 1906 Atlanta Massacre of 1906
- August 14 – 16, 1908 Springfield race riot of 1908
- 1909 Crazy Snake Rebellion
- February 10 – April 19, 1910 Philadelphia general strike (1910)
- July 4, 1910 Johnson–Jeffries riots
- October 1, 1910 Los Angeles Times bombing
- 1910 – 1919 Border War
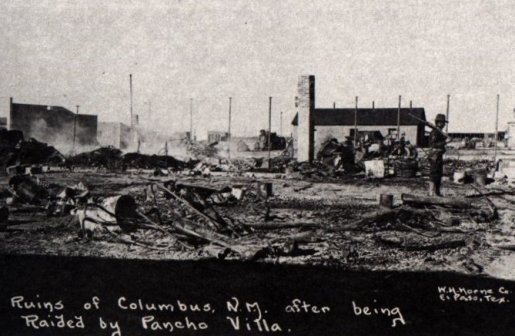
  The ruins of Columbus, New Mexico after the battle.
  - 1915
    - Bandit War
    - Raid on Norias Ranch
    - Ojo de Agua Raid
    - Battle of Nogales (1915)
  - 1916
    - Battle of Columbus (1916)
    - Raid on Glenn Springs
    - Raid on San Ygnacio
  - 1917
    - Brite Ranch raid
  - 1918
    - Neville Ranch raid
    - Porvenir massacre (1918)
    - Battle of Ambos Nogales
  - 1919
    - Battle of Ciudad Juárez (1919)
    - Candelaria border incursion of 1919
- 1911 Battle of Kelley Creek
- January 11 – March 12, 1912 1912 Lawrence textile strike
- April 18, 1912 – July 1913 Paint Creek–Cabin Creek strike of 1912
- July 7, 1912 Grabow riot
- February 25 – July 28, 1913 1913 Paterson silk strike
- July 23, 1913 – April 13, 1914 Copper Country Strike of 1913–1914
- August 3, 1913 Wheatland hop riot
- September 23, 1913 – December 1914 Colorado Coalfield War
  - April 20, 1914 Ludlow Massacre
- October 31 – November 7, 1913 Indianapolis streetcar strike of 1913
- 1914 – 1915 Bluff War
- July 12, 1914 Hartford coal mine riot
- 1914 – 1918 World War I
  - July 30, 1916 Black Tom explosion
  - January 11, 1917 Kingsland explosion
  - August 2 – 3, 1917 Green Corn Rebellion
  - July 21, 1918 Attack on Orleans
- July 22, 1916 Preparedness Day Bombing
- November 5, 1916 Everett massacre
- May 28 – July 3, 1917 East St. Louis massacre
- July 1917 1917 Chester race riot
- July 12, 1917 Bisbee Deportation
- August 23, 1917 Houston riot of 1917
- 1918 – 1931 Osage Indian murders
- 1918 Battle of Bear Valley
- February 6 – 11, 1919 Seattle General Strike
- 1919 Red Summer
  - April 10, 1919 Morgan County, West Virginia riot of 1919
  - April 13, 1919 Jenkins County, Georgia, riot of 1919
  - May 9 – July 31, 1919 Race riots in Philadelphia during the 1919 Red Summer
  - May 10, 1919 Charleston riot of 1919
  - May 27, 1919 Putnam County, Georgia, arson attack
  - June 27, 1919 Annapolis riot of 1919
  - June 27, 1919 Macon, Mississippi, race riot
  - June 29, 1919 New London riot of 1919
  - July 3, 1919 Bisbee Riot
  - July 6, 1919 Dublin, Georgia riot
  - July 8, 1919 1919 Coatesville call to arms
  - July 12, 1919 Longview race riot
  - July 14, 1919 Garfield Park riot of 1919
  - July 15, 1919 Port Arthur riot 1919
  - July 19 – 24, 1919 Washington race riot of 1919
  - July 20 – August 21, 1919 New York race riots of 1919
  - July 21, 1919 1919 Norfolk race riot
  - July 27 – August 3, 1919 Chicago race riot of 1919
  - July 31, 1919 Syracuse riot of 1919
  - August 1, 1919 Whatley, Alabama race riot of 1919
  - August 27 – 29, 1919 Laurens County, Georgia race riot of 1919
  - August 30 – 31, 1919 Knoxville riot of 1919
  - September 28 – 29, 1919 Omaha race riot of 1919
  - September 30 – October 2, 1919 Elaine massacre
  - October 1 – 2, 1919 Baltimore riots of 1919
  - October 31, 1919 Corbin, Kentucky race riot of 1919
  - November 11, 1919 Wilmington, Delaware race riot of 1919
  - November 22, 1919 Bogalusa sawmill killings
- May 1, 1919 May Day riots of 1919
- November 11, 1919 Centralia massacre (Washington)
- May 19, 1920 Battle of Matewan
- August 1–7, 1920 Denver streetcar strike of 1920
- September 16, 1920 Wall Street bombing
- November 2 – 3, 1920 Ocoee massacre
- September 7, 1920 – February 1921 1920 Alabama coal strike
- May 31 – June 1, 1921 Tulsa race massacre
- September 10 – 21, 1921 Battle of Blair Mountain
- April 1 – September 11, 1922 UMW General coal strike (1922)
  - June 21 – 22, 1922 Herrin massacre
- December 6 – 15, 1922 Perry massacre
- January 1 – 7, 1923 Rosewood massacre
- 1923 Posey War
- September 9, 1924 Hanapepe massacre
- May 18, 1927 Bath School disaster
- October 18, 1927 – May 1928 1927–1928 Colorado Coal Strike
  - November 21, 1927 Columbine Mine massacre
- February 4, 1929 Saint Valentine's Day massacre
- April 1 – September 14, 1929 Loray Mill strike
- February 1930 – April 15, 1931 Castellammarese War
- 1931 – 1939 Harlan County War
  - May 15, 1931 Battle of Evarts
- 1931 Red River Bridge War
- September 21 – 25, 1931 Iowa Cow War
- March 7, 1932 Ford Hunger March
- July 28, 1932 Bonus Army
- June 17, 1933 Kansas City massacre
- April 12, 1934 – June 3, 1934 Auto-Lite strike
- May 16 - August 21, 1934 Minneapolis general strike of 1934
- May 9 – July 31, 1934 1934 West Coast waterfront strike
- March 19, 1935 Harlem riot of 1935
- October 24, 1935 Río Piedras massacre
- March 21, 1937 Ponce massacre
- May 26, 1937 Battle of the Overpass
- May 30, 1937 1937 Memorial Day massacre
- 1939 – 1945 World War II
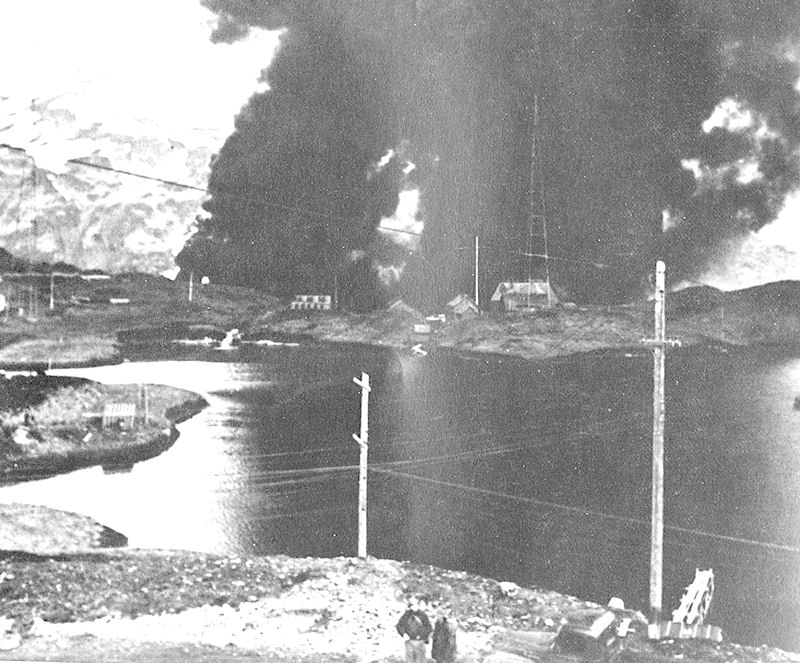
  The Navy radio station at Dutch Harbor burning after the Japanese attack.
    - 1941
    - Attack on Pearl Harbor
    - Niihau incident
    - First Bombardment of Midway
    - Battle of Guam (1941)
    - Shelling of Johnston and Palmyra
  - 1942
    - Bombardment of Ellwood
    - Battle of Los Angeles
    - Operation Pastorius
    - Battle of the Aleutian Islands
    - Battle of Dutch Harbor
    - Torpedo Alley
    - Bombardment of Fort Stevens
    - Japanese occupation of Kiska
    - Battle of Midway
    - Japanese occupation of Attu
    - Lordsburg killings
    - Lookout Air Raids
    - Escape from Fort Stanton
  - 1943
    - Landing at Amchitka
    - Battle of Attu
    - Operation Cottage
  - 1944
    - Mariana and Palau Islands campaign
    - Battle of Saipan
    - Port Chicago disaster
    - Second Battle of Guam
    - Battle of Tinian
    - Fort Lawton Riot
    - Great Papago Escape
  - 1945
    - Santa Fe Riot
    - Project Hula
    - Battle of Point Judith
    - Utah prisoner of war massacre
- May 30, 1943 Zoot Suit Riots
- June 15 – 17, 1943 Beaumont race riot of 1943
- June 20–22, 1943 1943 Detroit race riot
- August 1 – 2, 1943 Harlem riot of 1943

==== 1946 – 2000 ====
- 1946 Battle of Alcatraz
- 1946 Battle of Athens (1946)
- June 21, 1949 Fairground Park riot
- June 29, 1949 Anacostia Pool riot
- August 27, 1949 Peekskill riots
- November 8 – 12, 1949 Englewood race riot
- 1950 – 1954 Puerto Rican Nationalist Party insurgency
  - October 30, 1950 Jayuya Uprising
  - October 30, 1950 Utuado uprising
  - October 30, 1950 San Juan Nationalist revolt
- July 11 – 12, 1951 Cicero race riot of 1951
- March 1, 1954 1954 United States Capitol shooting
- January 18, 1958 Battle of Hayes Pond
- May 14, 1961 Anniston and Birmingham bus attacks
- September 30 – October 1, 1962 Ole Miss riot of 1962
- April 3 – May 10, 1963 Birmingham campaign
- July 16 – 22, 1964 Harlem riot of 1964
- July 24 – 26, 1964 1964 Rochester race riot
- August 15 – 17, 1964 Dixmoor race riot
- August 28 – 30, 1964 1964 Philadelphia race riot
- March 7 – 25, 1965 Selma to Montgomery marches
- August 11 – 17, 1965 Watts riots
- June 5 – June 26, 1966 March Against Fear
- June 12 – 14, 1966 Division Street riots
- July 12 – 15, 1966 1966 Chicago West Side riots
- July 18 – 23, 1966 Hough riots
- August 1, 1966 University of Texas tower shooting
- September 1, 1966 1966 Dayton race riot
- September 27 – October 1, 1966 Hunters Point social uprising
- June 5, 1967 Tierra Amarilla courthouse raid
- Summer of 1967 Long, hot summer of 1967
  - June 26 – July 1, 1967 1967 Buffalo riot
  - July 12 – 17, 1967 1967 Newark riots
  - July 14 – 16, 1967 1967 Plainfield riots
  - July 23 – 27, 1967 1967 Detroit riot
  - July 31 – August 3, 1967 1967 Milwaukee riot
- February 8, 1968 Orangeburg massacre
- April 4 – May 27, 1968 King-assassination riots
  - April 4 – 5, 1968 1968 New York City riot
  - April 4 – 8, 1968 1968 Washington, D.C. riots
  - April 5 – 7, 1968 1968 Chicago riots
  - April 5 – 11, 1968 1968 Pittsburgh riots
  - April 6 – 14, 1968 Baltimore riot of 1968
  - April 9, 1968 1968 Kansas City, Missouri riot
  - April 9 – 10, 1968 Wilmington riot of 1968
- July 23 – 26, 1968 Glenville shootout
- August 7 – 8, 1968 1968 Miami riot
- August 8 – 9, 1969 Tate–LaBianca murders
- August 23 – 28, 1968 1968 Democratic National Convention protests
- May 21 – 25, 1969 1969 Greensboro uprising
- June 28 – July 3, 1969 Stonewall riots
- July 1969 1969 York race riot
- October 8 – 11, 1969 Days of Rage
- November 20, 1969 – June 11, 1971 Occupation of Alcatraz
- May 4, 1970 Kent State shootings
- May 11 – 12, 1970 1970 Augusta riot
- August 7, 1970 Marin County Civic Center attacks
- August 24 – 27, 1970 1970 Memorial Park riot
- November 5 – 6, 1970 Newhall incident
- 1971 Attica Prison riot
- 1971 Crips–Bloods gang war
- August 30 – September 22, 1972 Occupation of Catalina Island
- 1973 Wounded Knee Occupation
- 1973 Mark Essex Attacks
- 1974 Gangster Disciples–Black Disciples conflict
- May 17, 1974 SLA shootout
- July 11 – 17, 1974 Baltimore police strike
- 1974 – 1976 Boston desegregation busing crisis
- December 29, 1975 1975 LaGuardia Airport bombing
- March 9 – 11, 1977 1977 Washington, D.C., attack and hostage taking
- July 4 – 5, 1977 Humboldt Park riot
- July 13 – 14, 1977 New York City blackout of 1977
- 1979 – 1980 Miami drug war
- May 21, 1979 White Night riots
- November 3, 1979 Greensboro massacre
- February 2 – 3, 1980 New Mexico State Penitentiary riot
- May 8, 1980 Norco shootout
- May 17 – 20, 1980 1980 Miami riots
- January 12, 1981 1981 Muñiz Air National Guard Base attack
- October 20, 1981 Brink's robbery (1981)
- December 28 – 30, 1982 1982 Overtown riot
- January 11 – 13, 1983 Shannon Street massacre
- July 18, 1984 San Ysidro McDonald's massacre
- May 13, 1985 1985 MOVE bombing
- April 11, 1986 1986 FBI Miami shootout
- November 13 – 23, 1987 Atlanta prison riots
- January, 1988 Singer–Swapp standoff
- August 6 – 7, 1988 1988 Tompkins Square Park riot
- January 16 – 19, 1989 1989 Miami riot
- September 23, 1989 Ash Street shootout
- August 19 – 21, 1991 Crown Heights riot
- April 29 – May 4, 1992 1992 Los Angeles riots
- August 21–31, 1992 Ruby Ridge standoff
- February 26, 1993 1993 World Trade Center bombing
- February 28 – April 19, 1993 Waco siege
- January 6 – 7, 1995 Bojinka plot
- April 19, 1995 Oklahoma City bombing
- March 28, 1996 Montana Freemen Standoff
- July 27, 1996 Centennial Olympic Park bombing
- October 25 – November 14, 1996 1996 riots in St. Petersburg, Florida
- February 28, 1997 North Hollywood shootout
- April 27, 1997 – May 4, 1997 Davis Mountain Resort hostage crisis
- September 22 – October 31, 1997 Roby Standoff
- April 20, 1999 Columbine High School massacre
- November 30 – December 3, 1999 1999 Seattle WTO protests

=== 21st century ===
- 2001 – present war on terror
  - September 11, 2001 September 11 attacks
  - May 8, 2007 2007 Fort Dix attack plot
  - November 5, 2009 Fort Hood shooting
  - April 15, 2013 Boston Marathon bombing
  - December 2, 2015 2015 San Bernardino attack
  - June 12, 2016 Orlando nightclub shooting
  - October 31, 2017 2017 New York City truck attack
  - December 6, 2019 Naval Air Station Pensacola shooting
  - January 15, 2022 Colleyville synagogue hostage crisis
  - January 1, 2025 2025 New Orleans truck attack
- April 9 – 13 2001 Cincinnati riots of 2001
- 2002 River Run riot
- October 2 – 24, 2002 D.C. sniper attacks
- 2004 – 2006 Operation Backfire
- October 15, 2005 2005 Toledo riot
- May 1, 2007 2007 MacArthur Park rallies
- November 9, 2009 2009 Lakewood shooting
- December 14, 2012 Sandy Hook Elementary School shooting
- February 3 – 12, 2013 Christopher Dorner shootings and manhunt
- September 16, 2013 Washington Navy Yard shooting
- April 5 – May 2014 Bundy standoff
- August 9 – December 2, 2014 Ferguson unrest
- November 24 – December 10, 2014 2014 Oakland riots
- April 18 – May 3, 2015 2015 Baltimore protests
- May 17, 2015 2015 Waco shootout
- June 17, 2015 Charleston church shooting
- October 1, 2015 2015 Umpqua Community College shooting
- October 12, 2015 – July 2020 Atomwaffen Division attacks in the United States
- December 2, 2015 2015 San Bernardino attack
- January 13, 2016 National Western Complex shootout
- April 2016 – February 2017 Dakota Access Pipeline protests
- June 26, 2016 2016 Sacramento riot
- August 13 – 15, 2016 2016 Milwaukee riots
- September 20 – 23, 2016 2016 Charlotte protests and riots
- February – September, 2017 2017 Berkeley protests
- August 11 – 12, 2017 Unite the Right rally
- September 15 – November 24, 2017 2017 St. Louis protests
- October 1, 2017 2017 Las Vegas shooting
- November 5, 2017 Sutherland Springs church shooting
- February 14, 2018 Parkland high school shooting
- October 27, 2018 Pittsburgh synagogue shooting
- August 3, 2019 2019 El Paso shooting
- December 5, 2019 2019 Miramar shootout
- May 25, 2020 – September 26, 2023 2020–2023 United States racial unrest
  - May 26, 2020 – August 4, 2022 Breonna Taylor protests
  - May 26, 2020 – May 2, 2023 George Floyd protests
    - June 8, 2020 – July 1, 2020 Capitol Hill Occupied Protest
    - May 26, 2020 – May 2, 2023 2020–2023 Minneapolis–Saint Paul racial unrest
      - May 26, 2020 – June 20, 2021 George Floyd Square occupied protest
      - August 26 – 31, 2020 2020 Minneapolis false rumors riot
      - September 11, 2020 – June 25, 2021 Protests in Minneapolis regarding the trial of Derek Chauvin
      - June 3 – November 3, 2021 2021 Uptown Minneapolis unrest
  - August 23 – September 1, 2020 Kenosha unrest
  - April 11, 2021 – February 18, 2022 Daunte Wright protests
  - January 27 – February 1, 2023 Tyre Nichols protests
- January 6, 2021 2021 United States Capitol attack
- February 2, 2021 2021 Sunrise, Florida shootout
- 2021 – 2023 Stop Cop City
- 2021 Wakefield standoff
- May 14, 2022 Buffalo supermarket shooting
- May 24, 2022 Uvalde school shooting
- June 30, 2022 shooting of Kentucky police officers
- March 27, 2023 2023 Nashville school shooting
- October 8, 2023 – present Gaza war protests in the United States
  - April 2025 Brooklyn clashes
    - 2025 pro-Israel mob attack in Brooklyn
- October 25, 2023 2023 Lewiston shootings
- April 29, 2024 2024 Charlotte shootout
- February 22, 2025 UPMC Memorial Hospital shooting
- June 6, 2025 June 2025 Los Angeles protests
- September 17, 2025 North Codorus Township shooting
- October 12, 2025 Saint Helena Island shooting
- January 9, 2026 Cedarbluff shootings
- March 12, 2026 Old Dominion University shooting
- April 19, 2026 Shreveport shooting
- May 18, 2026 Islamic Center of San Diego shooting

== See also ==
- Indian Wars
- Indian massacre
- Second Happy Time
- American Theater (World War II)
- List of conflicts in British America
- List of wars involving the United States
- United States military casualties of war
- List of incidents of civil unrest in the United States
