= List of battles fought in Illinois =

This is an incomplete list of all military confrontations that have occurred within the boundaries of the modern U.S. State of Illinois since European contact.

Name	Date	Location	War	Result	Dead	Belligerents
Battle for Grand Kaskaskia	September 18, 1680	Near Present-day Ottawa, Illinois	Beaver Wars	Iroquois victory	~880	France and Tamaroa vs. Iroquois
Siege of Fox Fort	August–September 1730	Present-day McLean County, Illinois	Fox Wars	French and Allied victory	~500	France and Native Allies vs. Meskwaki
Capture of Fort Gage	July 5, 1778	Present-day Kaskaskia, Illinois	American Revolutionary War	US victory	0	United States vs. Great Britain
Battle of St. Louis	May 25, 1780	Present-day Cahokia, Illinois and St. Louis, Missouri	Anglo-Spanish War	Spanish/US victory	25+	United States and Spain vs. Great Britain and Indian Nations
Battle of Fort Dearborn	August 15, 1812	Present-day Chicago, Illinois	War of 1812	Potawatomi victory	67	United States vs. Potawatomi
Battle of Africa Point	April 18, 1813	near Palestine, Illinois	War of 1812	Kickapoo victory	9	United States vs. Kickapoo
Battle of Rock Island Rapids	July 19, 1814	Campbell's Island, Illinois	War of 1812	Native victory	18+	United States vs. Sauk, Meskwaki and Kickapoo
Battle of Stillman's Run	May 14, 1832	Near present-day Stillman Valley, Illinois	Black Hawk War	Native victory	15–17	United States vs. Sauk and Meskwaki
Buffalo Grove ambush	May 19, 1832	Near present-day Polo, Illinois	Black Hawk War	Native victory	1+	United States vs. Kickapoo
St. Vrain Massacre	May 19, 1832	Near present-day Pearl City, Illinois	Black Hawk War	Native victory	4	United States vs. Ho-Chunk or Sauk and Meskwaki
Plum River raid	May 21, 1832	Near present-day Savanna, Illinois	Black Hawk War		0	United States vs. Sauk or Meskwaki
Battle of Kellogg's Grove	June 16 and 25, 1832	Near Kent, Illinois	Black Hawk War	US victory	23+	United States vs. Sauk, Meskwaki and Kickapoo
Battle of Waddams Grove	June 18, 1832	Near Waddams Grove, Illinois	Black Hawk War	US victory	5–9	United States vs. Sauk
Battle of Apple River Fort	June 24, 1832	Near Elizabeth, Illinois	Black Hawk War	US victory	1+	United States vs. Sauk and Meskwaki
Illinois Mormon War	June 10, 1844 – September 16, 1846	Nauvoo, Illinois		Illinois victory	~10	Illinois and Illinois Militia vs. Nauvoo Legion
Charleston riot	March 28, 1864	Charleston, Illinois	Civil War		9	United States vs. Copperheads
Haymarket Affair	May 4, 1886	Chicago, Illinois			11	Chicago Police Department vs. Federation of Organized Trades and Labor Unions
Battle of Virden	October 12, 1898	Virden, Illinois	Coal Wars		11	United Mine Workers vs. Thiel Detective Service Company
Herrin Massacre	June 21–22, 1922	Herrin, Illinois	Coal Wars		23	United Mine Workers vs. Southern Illinois Coal Company
