= Senator Strode =

Senator Strode may refer to:

- Aubrey E. Strode (1873–1946), Virginia State Senate
- James M. Strode (1804–1857/1860), Illinois State Senate
