= Battle of Africa Point =

- Part of the War of 1812
- The location of the Battle of Africa Point is in Crawford County, Illinois
Date	April 18, 1813
Location	near Fort LaMotte, Illinois Territory 38.998°N 87.598°W
Result	None

Belligerents
United States	Kickapoo

Commanders and leaders
Captain Pierce Andrews	Unknown

Strength
12	Unknown

Casualties and losses
4 killed, 2 badly wounded	5 killed

In the Illinois territory during the War of 1812, there was a brief engagement between a group of United States Rangers and Native Americans called the Battle of Africa Point.

On April 18, 1813, during the fortification phase of Fort LaMotte, two barrel coopers Isaac Brimberry and Thomas Kennedy went up 'Africa Point', a knoll surrounded by swamp on the Wabash River, to procure some wood. They came across Indian canoes pulled on the shore of the river. Both Brimberry and Kennedy reported their sightings to the Fort LaMotte commander, Captain Pierce Andrews.

Andrews sent up a squad of skirmishers with the timber party to look after the Indians. The rangers divided themselves into two groups, a six-man party going in advance while the other stayed back and acted as a reserve. On 'Africa Point' the advance group was ambushed and fired upon by the Kickapoo Indians. During the ensuing battle, the American party retreated suffering 4 dead and the 2 badly wounded who escaped back to the fort. Upon hearing rifle fire, the rear guard fell back to the fort as well. The Indians had 5 killed.

== See also ==
- List of battles fought in Illinois
