= Buffalo Grove, Ogle County, Illinois =

Buffalo Grove Nanusha St. Marion, Buffalo
- Unincorporated community
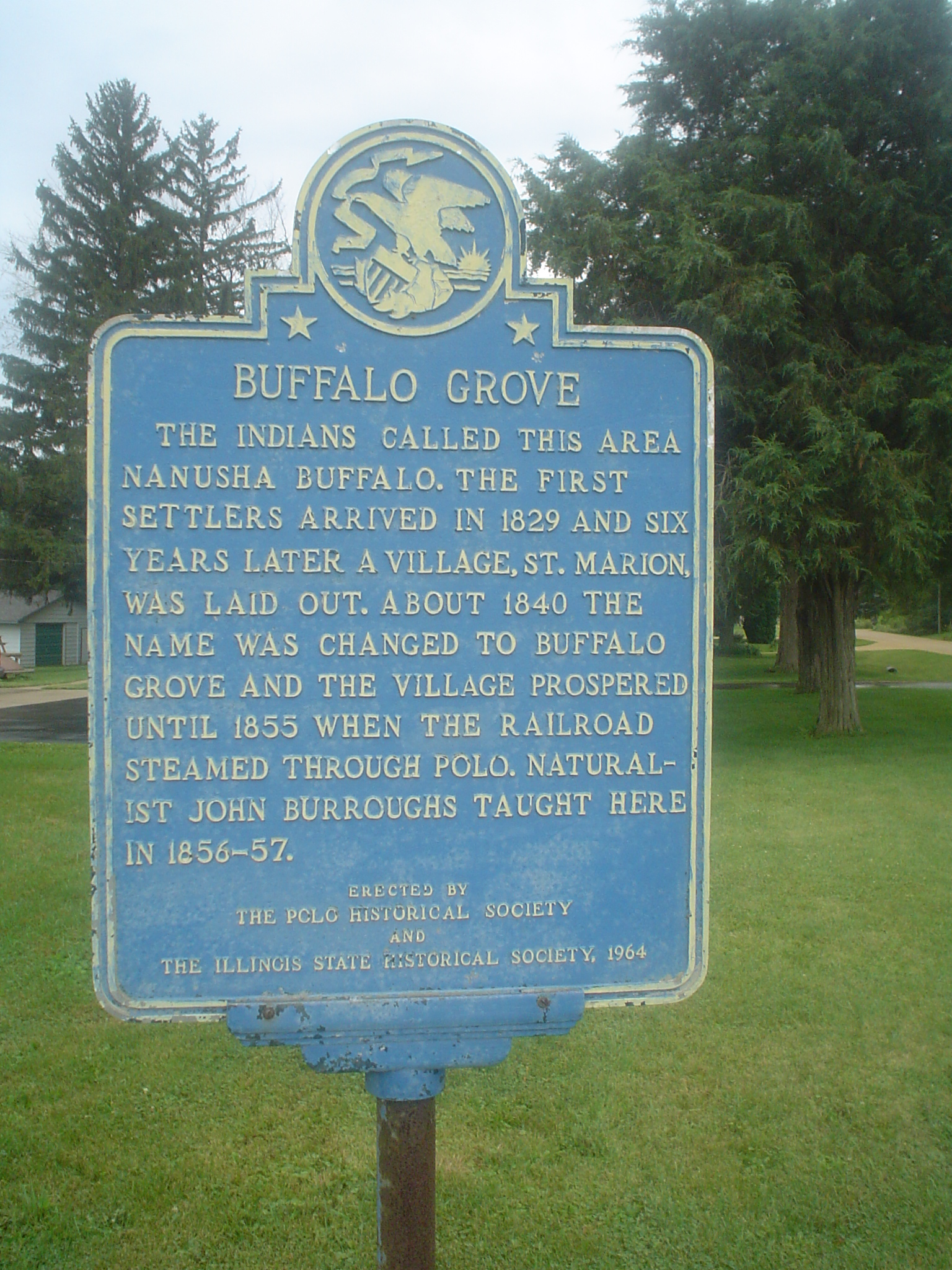
- Sign along Milledgeville Road

- Location within Ogle County Buffalo Grove (Illinois)
- Coordinates: 41°58′52″N 89°35′42″W
- Country: United States
- State: Illinois
- County: Ogle
- Township: Buffalo
- Founded: 1830
- Elevation: 843 ft (257 m)
- Time zone: UTC-6 (CST)
  - Summer (DST): UTC-5 (CDT)
- ZIP code: 61064
- Area codes: 779, 815
- GNIS feature ID: 1808190

Buffalo Grove is an unincorporated community in the Ogle County township of Buffalo, Illinois, United States. It was the first settlement in Ogle County, and was once a bustling frontier town that attracted many of Ogle County's early residents. The creation of the Illinois Central Railroad, caused most of the residents and businesses to move to Polo.

== Nomenclature ==
Native Americans who originally lived on the lands of Buffalo Grove, called the area "Nanusha" (Na-noo-sha), which means "buffalo." When white settlers came to the lands they found no buffalo; instead they found buffalo bones. In the winter of 1778, a heavy snow descended on the Mississippi Valley. Fluctuating temperatures caused the snow to melt and refreeze and the snow crusted over, thus the buffalo were unable to access their food supply and many starved to death.

== History ==
During the early 19th century, many settlers from the east coast of the United States traveled to Galena after the establishment of lead mines in the area. Many of the trails from Dixon's Ferry (originally called Ogee's Ferry) passed through what would later become Ogle County. John Ankeny marked Ankeny's Trail from Dixon's Ferry to Galena in 1829, and while doing so claimed an areas of trees as his own. In the spring of 1830, Ogle County's first settler, Isaac Chambers, erected the first cabin near the Galena Trail. Chambers intended to build and manage an inn, or tavern as a stopping point on the way to Galena. When Ankeny returned a controversy arose over the land's ownership. Chambers prevailed, and Ankeny moved further down the trail and opened an opposing tavern.

By the spring of 1831, Oliver W. Kellogg arrived at Buffalo Grove, and bought his claim from Chambers. Another settler, Samuel Reed, planted 14 acres (57,000 m^{2}) of corn in 1831, and by 1832 he also included wheat on the first farm in Ogle County.

Later that spring, the Black Hawk War began with the first armed confrontation at the Stillman's Run. The Sauk were victorious during this confrontation with Colonel Isaiah Stillman's militia. Dispatches were sent to all settlers, ordering them to the military headquarters near Dixon's Ferry. Buffalo Grove's settlers first went to Dixon's Ferry, then moved on to Peoria where they remained until September. While the settlers were away, a group of men returned to their homes to look after some of the stock that remained in the settlement. When the men returned to Buffalo Grove, they found the body of William Durley in the road near the woods. The event became known as the Buffalo Grove ambush or massacre. Durley was originally buried near the spot he died at by a party who would become the victims of the St. Vrain massacre the next day. In 1910 the Polo Historical Society moved Durley's remains and erected a historical marker and memorial over his new grave.

The settlement continued to grow, including the establishment of the Buffalo Grove Post Office on February 12, 1833. There is some discrepancy as to the date of the post office's establishment and at least one source asserts the date as 1835. The area's first merchant, Colonel John D. Stevenson, arrived from Louisiana to set up a store in 1834. The following year the town was platted and named St. Marion, but when the post office was established it was called Buffalo Grove. The name of the settlement was officially changed in 1839 by the residents. In 1836, the area's first sawmill was built along Buffalo Creek, and some traces of it remain extant.

When construction of the Illinois Central Railroad (ICRR) began in 1852, the village population was nearly 1,000 residents; in 1835 15 families lived in the vicinity of Buffalo Grove. Also in 1852, a steam sawmill was built in order to supply the ICRR with railroad ties.

Following the construction of the Illinois Central Railroad, the new town of Polo was founded along the tracks in March 1853. Nearly all residents from Buffalo Grove moved their homes and businesses to Polo in order to take advantage of the new railroad. The Buffalo Grove Post Office was moved in the dead of night in January 1855 to avoid trouble. The office was opened in its new location the next morning. One notable Buffalo Grove resident was naturalist John Burroughs, who taught in Buffalo Grove from 1856 to 1857 before moving back East to marry. Today, Buffalo Grove no longer remains as a true village, instead having about a dozen homes in its area.

== Church and cemetery ==
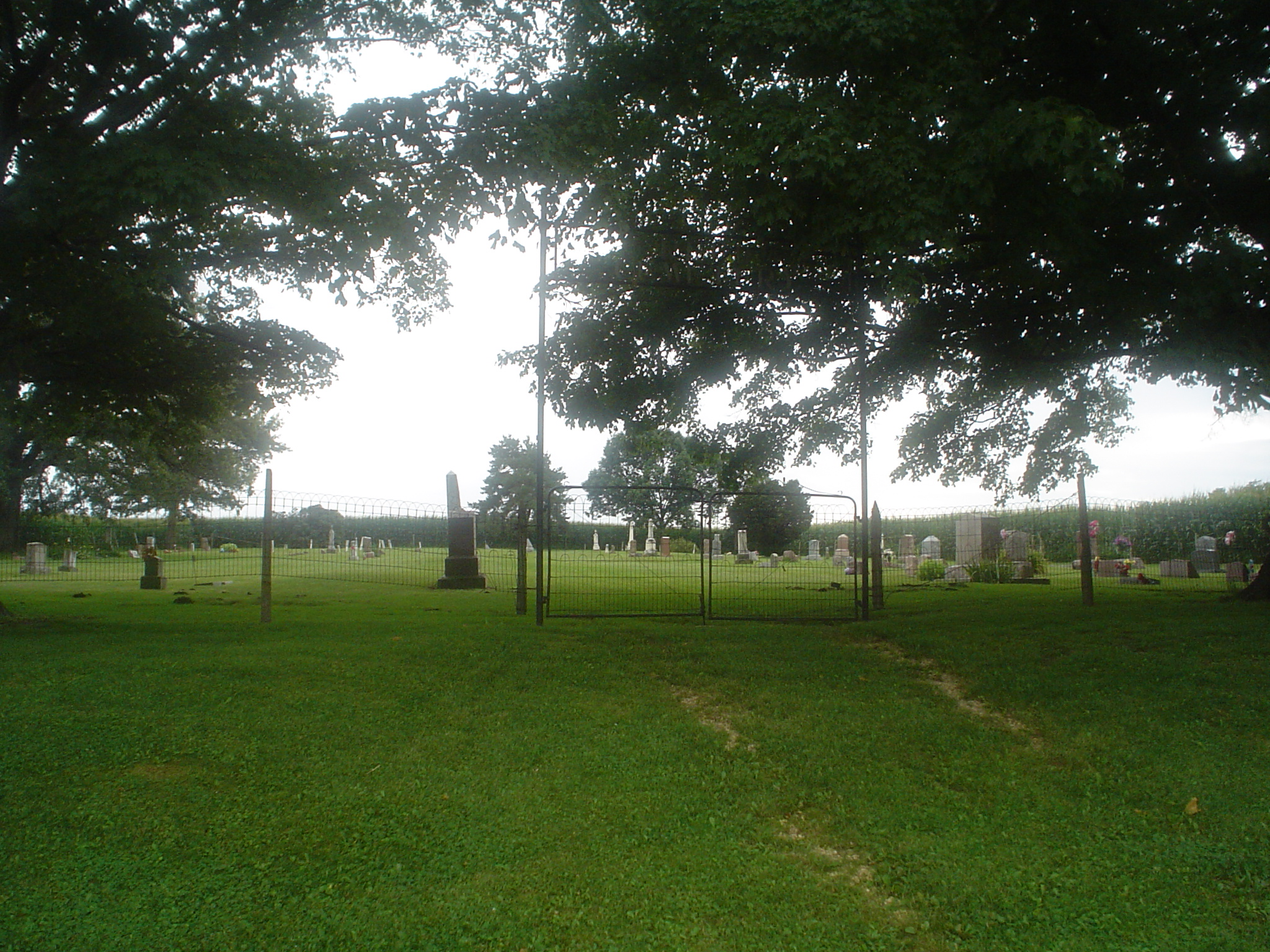
Picture from the road of Reed Cemetery.

Buffalo Grove is home to one cemetery; the Reed cemetery is located west of the unincorporated village. The cemetery derived its name from Samuel Reed Sr. who died suddenly on August 17, 1833. Reed was the first to be buried in the new cemetery, and the cemetery was named after him.

In the fall of 1843, Elder Alexander Conlee established the Buffalo Grove Church. Originally the congregation met at the Doty School, which was built to serve as both a school and church.
