= Plum River raid =

Attack by Native Americans

Coordinates: 42°5′39″N 90°9′23″W

- Part of the Black Hawk War
Date	May 21, 1832
Location	present-day Savanna, Illinois
Result	No result

Belligerents
United States	Sauk or Fox

Commanders and leaders
James M. Strode	unknown

Strength
6; 3 present	unknown; small band

Casualties and losses
0	0

The Plum River raid was a bloodless skirmish that occurred at present-day Savanna, Illinois, on May 21, 1832, as part of the Black Hawk War. Most of the settlement's inhabitants, except for a few defenders, had fled for Galena, Illinois, before the raid happened. A small band of Native Americans, either Sauk or Fox, attacked the settlement while only three of the six defenders were present. The men who were present fell back to the blockhouse and a firefight ensued for about one hour, after which the attackers withdrew. No one was killed or injured during the attack, but in its aftermath Colonel James M. Strode dispatched a detachment of militia to Savanna. They returned to Galena without incident and the settlement at Savanna was temporarily abandoned.

== Background ==
As a consequence of an 1804 treaty between the Governor of Indiana Territory and a group of Sauk and Fox leaders regarding land settlement, the Sauk and Fox tribes vacated their lands in Illinois and moved west of the Mississippi in 1828. However, Sauk Chief Black Hawk and others disputed the treaty, claiming that the full tribal councils had not been consulted, nor did those representing the tribes have authorization to cede lands. Angered by the loss of his birthplace, between 1830–31 Black Hawk led a number of incursions across the Mississippi River, but was persuaded to return west each time without bloodshed. In April 1832, encouraged by promises of alliance with other tribes and the British, he again moved his so-called "British Band" of around 1000 warriors and non-combatants into Illinois. Finding no allies, he attempted to return across the Mississippi (to modern Iowa), but ensuing events led to the Battle of Stillman's Run. A number of other engagements followed and the militia of Michigan Territory and the state of Illinois were mobilized to hunt down Black Hawk's band. The conflict became known as the Black Hawk War. After Stillman's Run, an ambush at Buffalo Grove killed one militia member two days before the raid on the Plum River settlement.

== Prelude ==
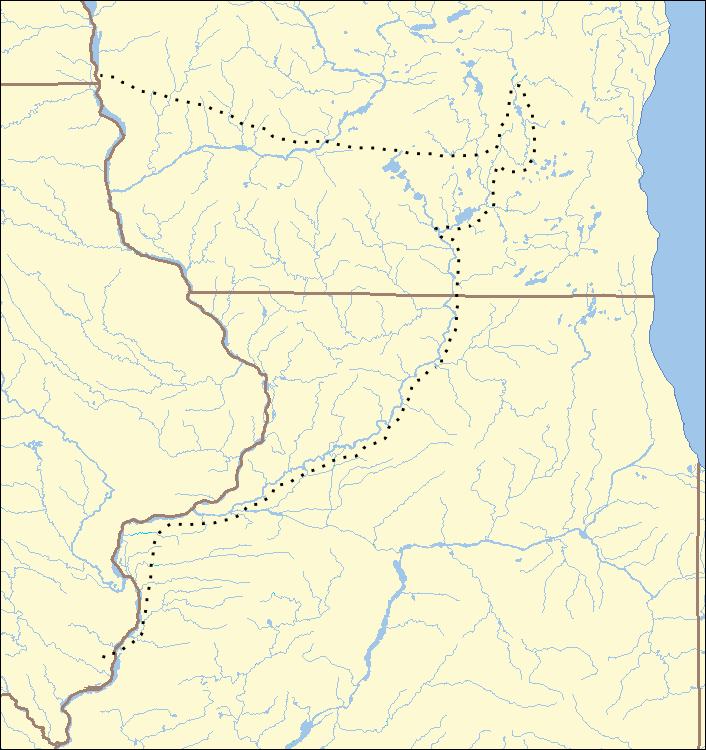
Map of Black Hawk War sites
Battle (with name) Fort / settlement Native village
Symbols are wikilinked to article

The settlement at the mouth of the Plum River was established in 1827 when copper was discovered near the Mississippi River. When the Black Hawk War erupted in 1832, the settlement at Plum River consisted of 25 people. When the settlers were informed of Black Hawk's invasion they were undecided about whether or not to abandon their homes for safer grounds in Galena, Illinois. In the end, while nearby towns such as Hanover emptied of their residents, the citizens at Plum River decided to send the women and children to Galena and leave the men to stick it out on the frontier. They partially disassembled two of the settlement's homes and constructed a blockhouse for protection. Left to defend the impromptu fortifications were Aaron Pierce, Vance Davidson, Robert Upton, William Blundell, Leonard Goss and a man known as Hays. On May 19 another group of militia volunteers were ambushed at Buffalo Grove and two days later the more famous Indian Creek massacre occurred (on the same day as the raid at Plum River).

== Attack ==
On May 21, 1832, a small raiding party made up of some independent minded braves from Keokuk's village or the Fox village at Dubuque's Mines carried out a raid on the settlement at present-day Savanna, Illinois on the Plum River. The party originated west of the Mississippi River and were probably motivated by a desire to collect needed supplies. When the small raiding party arrived at the settlement they found it practically deserted: only three men were present. Of the six men originally at the settlement, three had left when the raiding party arrived: Blundell was away, Upton was hunting nearby, and Davidson had left the area in search of a horse. Of the three men left at the settlement, Hays and Goss were trying to round up livestock, while only Pierce remained at the blockhouse. Pierce heard a dog barking outside and looked up to see a small band of Native Americans creeping along the river's edge. He immediately sounded the alarm and Hays and Goss sprinted for the blockhouse. Gunshots started to explode behind the men as they approached the protection of their makeshift fortification.

Goss darted inside, but Hays slipped and fell before he could enter the blockhouse. As he fell, three musket balls lodged themselves into the wall where he had been standing moments before. While the attackers reloaded, Hays slipped inside and for about an hour an exchange of heavy gunfire erupted between the parties before the attackers withdrew. A fourth man, Upton, was out hunting nearby; when he was discovered by the attackers he was chased throughout the afternoon. Upton escaped the attackers injury-free. In fact, no person was killed or injured during the Plum River raid. The small raiding party escaped with three horses, but two horses were badly wounded by gunfire, and the other shot dead by the settlement's defenders.

== Aftermath ==
The men at the Plum River settlement waited overnight and then fled to Galena where they reported the incident to Colonel James M. Strode. He ordered a militia party to the settlement to secure it and make sure the attackers were dealt with accordingly. When the detachment arrived at Savanna they found no Native Americans, and plenty of bullet holes from the battle. The group continued to Fort Armstrong, where they picked up supplies, and returned to Galena without incident. On June 1, then-Colonel Zachary Taylor expressed his concerns about recent events, including the Plum River raid in a letter to General Henry Atkinson. He stated that there had no doubt been an attack at the settlement, but no one was killed and the site abandoned since.
