= Buffalo Township, Illinois =

Buffalo Township
- Township
- Location in Ogle County
- Coordinates: 41°59′08″N 89°34′12″W
- Country: United States
- State: Illinois
- County: Ogle
- Established: November 6, 1849

Government
  - Supervisor: Phillip Fossler

Area
  - Total: 33.67 sq mi (87.2 km^{2})
  - Land: 33.67 sq mi (87.2 km^{2})
  - Water: 0 sq mi (0 km^{2}) 0%
- Elevation: 863 ft (263 m)

Population (2010)
  - Estimate (2016): 2,668
  - Density: 83.5/sq mi (32.2/km^{2})
- Time zone: UTC-6 (CST)
  - Summer (DST): UTC-5 (CDT)
- ZIP code: 61064
- FIPS code: 17-141-09421

Buffalo Township is one of twenty-four townships in Ogle County, Illinois, USA. As of the 2010 census, its population was 2,813 and it contained 1,284 housing units.

== Geography ==
According to the 2010 census, the township has a total area of 33.67 square miles (87.2 km^{2}), all land. It contains the city of Polo and the unincorporated town of Buffalo Grove.

=== Cemeteries ===
The township contains these four cemeteries: Buffalo Grove, Fairmount, Reed and Saint Mary's.

== Demographics ==
Historical population
Census	Pop.	Note	%±
2016 (est.)	2,668
U.S. Decennial Census

== School districts ==
- Polo Community Unit School District 222

== Political districts ==
- Illinois's 16th congressional district
- State House District 90
- State Senate District 45
