= Fort Lamotte =

Coordinates: 38°59′52.4″N 87°35′54.1″W

Fort Lamotte was a fort created between 1810 and 1812 by Baptists near Palestine, Illinois. It was the site of the Battle of Africa Point in the War of 1812, one of few battles of the war in the Illinois Territory. During the War of 1812 there were 26 families living in Fort LaMotte, and 90 rangers under the command of frontier officer Captain Pierce Andrews. It was in use through 1817 and is currently being recreated. The inhabitants of the Fort became the nucleus of Palestine. Fort Foot served as an expansion of and partial replacement for Fort Lamotte.

A marker at Palestine indicates that Frenchman John Lamotte became separated from the Lasalle party and reached the region in 1678.
