= Buffalo Grove ambush =

Coordinates: 41°59′28″N 89°36′10″W

- Part of the Black Hawk War
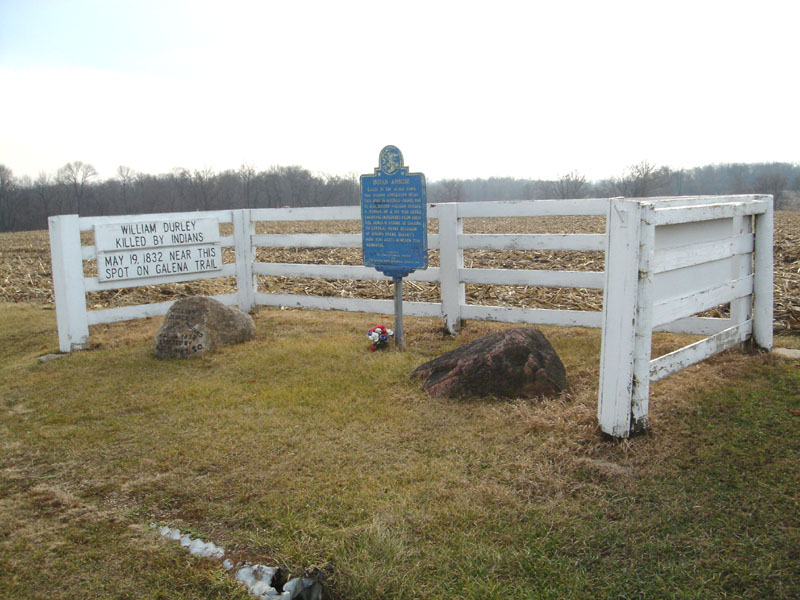
- Historical marker located west of Polo, Illinois
Date	May 19, 1832
Location	Near Polo, Illinois
Result	Kickapoo victory

Belligerents
United States	Kickapoo warriors

Commanders and leaders
Henry Atkinson; James M. Strode	

Strength
6	Not known

Casualties and losses
1	Not known

The Buffalo Grove ambush was an ambush that occurred on May 19, 1832 as part of the Black Hawk War. A six-man detail carrying dispatches from United States Colonel James M. Strode at Galena, Illinois to General Henry Atkinson at Dixon's Ferry was ambushed by Native Americans during the attack. William Durley was killed and buried near the site of the ambush. Durley's remains were initially interred by the party that would become victims of the St. Vrain massacre. Two other men had bullet holes in their clothing, but were uninjured. In 1910 the Polo Historical Society moved Durley's remains to a plot beneath a memorial they erected west of Polo, Illinois.

== Background ==
As a consequence of an 1804 treaty between the Governor of Indiana Territory and a group of Sauk and Fox leaders regarding land settlement, the Sauk and Fox tribes vacated their lands in Illinois and moved west of the Mississippi in 1828. However, Sauk Chief Black Hawk and others disputed the treaty, claiming that the full tribal councils had not been consulted, nor did those representing the tribes have authorization to cede lands. Angered by the loss of his birthplace, between 1830–31 Black Hawk led a number of incursions across the Mississippi River, but was persuaded to return west each time without bloodshed. In April 1832, encouraged by promises of alliance with other tribes and the British, he again moved his so-called "British Band" of around 1000 warriors and non-combatants into Illinois. Finding no allies, he attempted to return to Iowa, but ensuing events led to the Battle of Stillman's Run. A number of other engagements followed, and the state militias of Wisconsin and Illinois were mobilized to hunt down Black Hawk's band. The conflict became known as the Black Hawk War.

== Prelude ==
When the Black Hawk War began in the spring of 1832, the settlers at Buffalo Grove were notified of Black Hawk's victory at Stillman's Run and ordered to leave the grove. Most of the settlers went to Peoria where they remained for the duration of the war. On May 19, 1832 a small unit was detailed to carry dispatches from Colonel James M. Strode in Galena to General Henry Atkinson at Dixon's Ferry (present-day Dixon, Illinois). The group of men, which included soldiers Fred Stahl, William Durley, Vincent Smith, Redding Bennett, James Smith, and mail contractor John D. Winters, left Dixon around 3 p.m. on May 19.

== Ambush ==
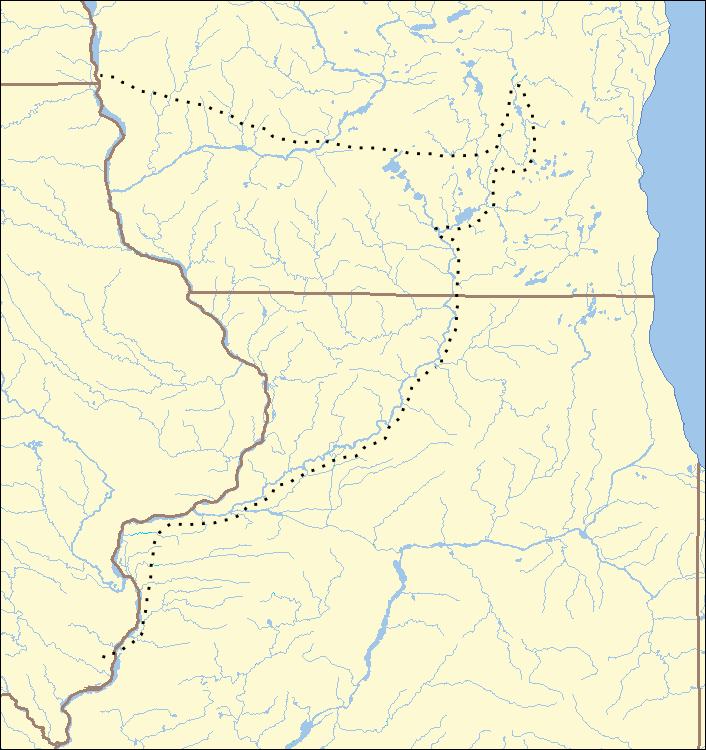
Map of Black Hawk War sites
Battle (with name) Fort / settlement Native village
Symbols are wikilinked to article

The Buffalo Grove ambush occurred near Buffalo Grove, Illinois, a small, unincorporated settlement in present-day Ogle County. As the group neared the edge of the grove one of the party noted the increased chances for ambush and suggested that the party avoid the usual route by taking a more roundabout route. The suggestion was opposed and Durley reared his horse and entered the wooded area within the grove. He had traveled only a few "bounds" when he was cut down by gunfire from the previously suggested ambush.

On May 20, 1832, Sergeant Stahl returned to Dixon's Ferry with the other four survivors of the attack and reported that his party had been ambushed by a group of Native Americans the evening before on the edge of the grove. He reported that Durley was killed instantly, scalped, and left on the spot. Stahl and James Smith both had bullets rip through articles of clothing but were uninjured and only Durley died in the attack.

== Aftermath ==
The events of the Buffalo Grove ambush are closely interrelated with those of the St. Vrain massacre. A group of four men, including Aaron Hawley and John Fowler, both casualties of the St. Vrain massacre, was en route to Galena when they stumbled upon the body of Durley at Buffalo Grove. The group returned to Dixon's Ferry, reported their find and stayed there overnight.

When Atkinson returned to Dixon on May 23 it was with dispatches destined for Fort Armstrong. He ordered Indian Agent Felix St. Vrain to join the group that had discovered Durley's body and travel with them to Galena. The group left Dixon and traveled north where they found, and interred the remains of Durley at Buffalo Grove.

The Polo Historical Society erected a memorial to Durley on May 19, 1910, the 78th anniversary of the attack. At that time, Durley's remains were moved from where St. Vrain's party buried him, near where he had fallen, and interred beneath the memorial. The Buffalo Grove ambush historical marker and memorial to Durley are located west of the city of Polo, Illinois along Eagle Point Road.

== Notes ==
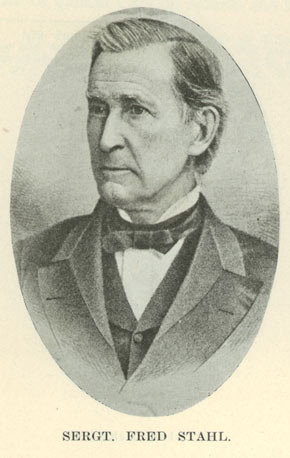
Sgt. Fred Stahl, one of the survivors of the ambush
