= James M. Strode =

19th century American militiaman and state politician

James McGowan Strode
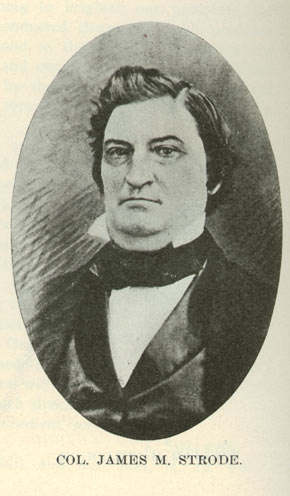
- Born: 1804; West Virginia or Kentucky, US
- Died: 1857/1860; Kentucky, US
- Military career
- Allegiance: United States
- Branch: Illinois militia
- Service years: 1827, 1832
- Rank: Colonel
- Commands: 27th Regiment Illinois Militia
- Conflicts: (Black Hawk War)
- Other work: Illinois State Senator (1832–1836)

James McGowan Strode (1804–1857/1860) was a militia officer and politician from the U.S. state of Illinois. He served in the Illinois militia during the Winnebago War and the Black Hawk War. Strode, originally from Tennessee, lived much of his life in Galena, Illinois. In Galena, during the Black Hawk War he was given command of the 27th Regiment of the Illinois militia and oversaw the construction of a fort in that city. Strode was involved in combat during the war at the infamous Battle of Stillman's Run. In 1835 Strode was elected to represent much of the region of Illinois north of Peoria in the Illinois State Senate.

== Early life ==
James M. Strode was from the U.S. state of Kentucky but lived much of life in Illinois. During the late 1820s Strode lived in Springfield, Illinois but from 1831 he lived in the city of Galena, Illinois.

== Military service ==
James M. Strode began his military service on July 20, 1827 as the Winnebago War was being waged on the frontier in the mining region of southern Wisconsin. Strode, living in Springfield, Illinois at the time, was one of hundreds of Sangamon County volunteers called up by Illinois Governor Ninian Edwards. Edwards sent the forces into the lead mining region around Galena, Illinois to protect settlers there from raids by the Ho-Chunk. Strode enlisted as a private and his company commander was Captain Bowling Green (or Bowlin Green). Once in Galena, a company of volunteers was formed under the command of Henry Dodge and Strode served as company commander at the rank of captain; Strode's company was mustered into service on August 26, 1827 and discharged on September 16, 1827.

Strode traveled to Chicago for the first time in 1831 and returned occasionally throughout his life. On one trip to the settlement at Chicago in 1832, with Benjamin Mills and Judge Richard M. Young, the group became aware of the early unrest in the Black Hawk War. Once in Chicago they warned the settlers there of the war and its danger to their settlement. Strode was at the disastrous defeat of Major Isaiah Stillman's militia force at Stillman's Run. An engagement he attended just for "the fun." Back in Galena, Strode rose to the rank of colonel and was given command of the frontier fort in Galena and the 27th Regiment of the Illinois Militia.

The fort was constructed in Galena beginning on May 19, 1832. The same day as fort construction began Strode detailed a small unit to carry dispatches from to General Henry Atkinson at Dixon's Ferry (present-day Dixon, Illinois). The group was ambushed by Kickapoo warriors later that day and one of the messengers was killed. On May 21, 1832 Strode declared martial law in Galena; his proclamation demanded that all able bodied men work on completing the fort from 9 a.m. to 6 p.m. until it was finished. His proclamation also prohibited the sale of "spirits" at grocers and taverns from 8 a.m. until 7 p.m.

The fort in Galena, known as the Stockade Refuge, was located at the center of town on Perry Street. It featured two blockhouses, one centered and the other in the corner of the stockade. The stockade's other three corners contained fortified houses. Strode's fortified home was about 200 feet to the east of the fort, along Bench Street. He also spent his command during the war passing down various orders to respond to incidents of violence across the frontier, such as the Plum River raid.

== Political career ==
In August 1832 Strode was elected as a Democratic state senator and moved to Chicago a year later. As a state senator Strode represented much of the area north of Peoria, and in 1835 he introduced legislation authorizing a government loan to commence work on the Illinois and Michigan Canal. The US$500,000 loan was negotiated by Illinois Governor Joseph Duncan, and in June 1836 construction on the canal began. In July 1836 he was commissioned as the register for the U.S. Land Office in Chicago, whose offices were located in the Saloon Building on Clark Street.

== Later life ==
Strode worked as an attorney for much of his life and after 1837 he was a "practicing member" of the Chicago Bar Association. Strode worked as a prosecutor until 1848. On May 16, 1848, in McHenry County, he married Cynthia Ann Beardsley, with whom he had a son and a daughter (Luella). He moved to Woodstock around the time of his marriage and served as McHenry County judge, 1854 to 1857. Strode died in Kentucky, where he had gone to settle a family estate. This was before 1861, when Cynthia remarried as a widow with Ephraim Pease.
