= St. Vrain massacre =

Incident in the Black Hawk War

Coordinates: 42°17′6″N 89°52′29″W

- Part of the Black Hawk War
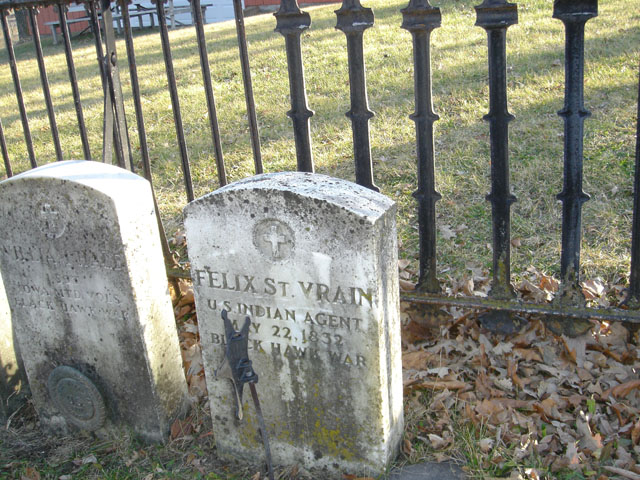
- The graves of Felix St. Vrain, at right; alongside victim, William Hale, at left, and his companions, John Fowler and Aaron Hawley, are buried in Kellogg's Grove Cemetery, Kellogg's Grove, Stephenson County, Illinois
Date	May 24, 1832
Location	Near present day Pearl City, Stephenson County, Illinois
Result	Ho-Chunk and Sauk victory

Belligerents
United States	Ho-Chunk or Sauk/Fox

Commanders and leaders
Henry Atkinson; Felix St. Vrain (Indian agent)	

Strength
7	approximately 30

Casualties and losses
4	0

The St. Vrain massacre was a tragic incident in the Black Hawk War. It occurred near present-day Pearl City, Illinois, in Kellogg's Grove, on May 24, 1832. The massacre was most likely committed by Ho-Chunk warriors who were unaffiliated with Black Hawk's band of warriors. It is also unlikely that the group of Ho-Chunk had the sanction of their nation. Killed in the massacre were United States Indian Agent Felix St. Vrain and three of his companions. Some accounts reported that St. Vrain's body was mutilated.

St. Vrain and his party were attacked while en route from Dixon's Ferry, Illinois (now Dixon) to Galena, Illinois. St. Vrain had been ordered by General Henry Atkinson to deliver dispatches to Fort Armstrong. Colonel Henry Dodge's men interred the remains of St. Vrain and his companions after the massacre.

== Prelude ==
United States Indian Agent Felix St. Vrain was traveling with several companions which included, John Fowler, William Hale, and Aaron Hawley. Those men, along with St. Vrain, were all reportedly killed in the attack; also traveling with St. Vrain was Thomas Kenney, Aquilla Floyd, and Alexander Higginbotham.

The Native Americans that attacked the group were not part of Black Hawk's band of warriors but they were en route to join that group when the massacre occurred. Older histories described the group as a band of Sac warriors while modern sources indicate that the band were associated with the Ho-Chunk nation. Black Hawk asserted that the group was Ho-Chunk and unaffiliated with his band in his autobiography.

In fact, most Ho-Chunk sided with the United States during the Black Hawk War. The warriors that attacked St. Vrain's party acted with no authority or oversight from the Ho-Chunk nation. As the war began to be defined along racial terms most white settlers in the region did not notice the distinction. This led to unwarranted fear of all Native Americans in the area, even those friendly to the settlers' cause. One example of this appeared in an article published in the New Galenian on May 30, 1832. While the article described the events of the massacre it also went on to associate the murders of St. Vrain and his companions with the Sauk and Fox of Keokuk's band.

It is supposed by many, that these Indians belong to Ke-o-kucks band We know nothing about it. Although Ke-o-kuck's band is supposed to be friendly, and are supplied with corn at the public expense, we acknowledge we have but little confidence in them. -New Galenian, May 30, 1832

Keokuk and his band were not near the scene when the murders occurred and had actually volunteered to assist white settlers against Black Hawk and his band of warriors.

== Massacre ==
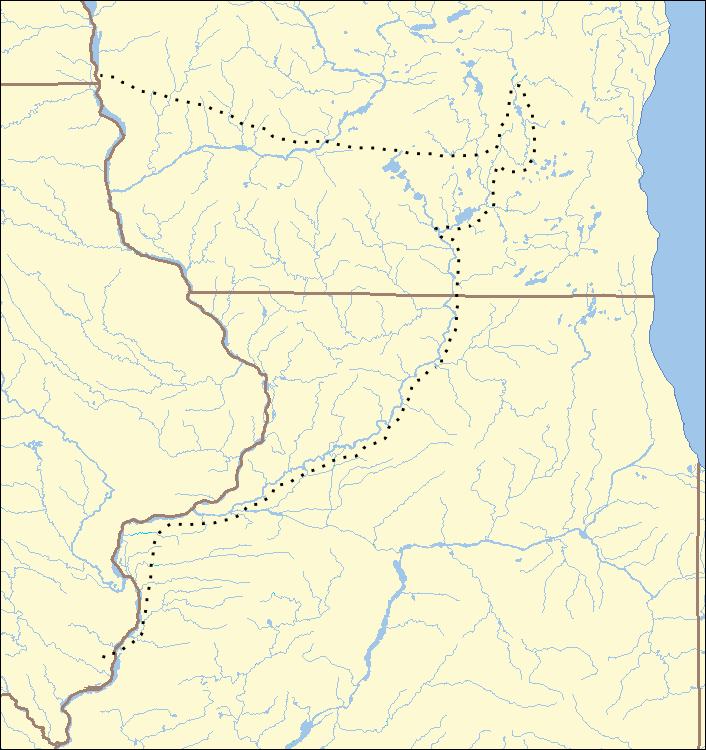
Map of Black Hawk War sites
Battle (with name) Fort / settlement Native village
Symbols are wikilinked to article

The St. Vrain massacre occurred near present-day Pearl City, Illinois, in an area known as Kellogg's Grove. Felix St. Vrain, a U.S. Indian Agent to the Sauk and Fox tribes, was in Dixon's Ferry, Illinois, under the command of General Henry Atkinson prior to the massacre.

A group composed of Aaron Hawley, John Fowler, Thomas Kenney and Alexander Higginbotham had been purchasing cattle in Sangamon County, Illinois when news of trouble with Black Hawk's band reached them. They immediately decided to return to northern Illinois to protect their homes. On May 22, 1832 the men left Dixon's Ferry for Galena, Illinois. At Buffalo Grove they discovered the body of William Durley, who had been killed in the Buffalo Grove massacre. The men immediately returned to Dixon's Ferry to report their find and remained in the town overnight.

The following day General Atkinson returned to Dixon's Ferry on with dispatches destined for Fort Armstrong. Atkinson ordered St. Vrain to travel with the Hawley party and deliver the dispatches to the fort. The men traveled north from Dixon's Ferry and back to Buffalo Grove, where they interred the remains of Durley. They then traveled another ten miles toward Fort Hamilton before camping for the night.

The next morning, May 24, they set out again, but stopped for breakfast after about three miles. As they finished eating, about 30 warriors approached. The men retreated, but four were shot and killed. Slain with St. Vrain were John Fowler, William Hale, and Aaron Hawley. An account of the massacre from Gen. George Wallace Jones, who was St. Vrain's brother-in-law and the man who identified his body, said the warriors had scalped the dead men, but also cut off the hands, head, and feet of St. Vrain and removed his heart. They reportedly passed around pieces of the heart for the braves to eat. At least one source indicated that the mutilation began before St. Vrain was dead.

Three men, Thomas Kenney, Aquilla Floyd, and Alexander Higginbotham, managed to escape. They eluded the warriors and arrived safely in Galena, Illinois three days later. It is said that Aaron Hawley was initially able to retreat from the scene, but apparently was later killed as he fled.

== 'The Little Bear' incident ==
Frank Stevens in his 1903 history of the war, The Black Hawk War stated the attackers were Sauk and led by Little Bear, a chief who had purportedly adopted Felix St. Vrain as a "blood brother," presumably relying upon an account published by former Illinois governor Thomas Ford, who had fought in that war (though not that battle). Noting Little Bear's presence, St. Vrain allegedly assured his companions that there was nothing to fear. The same claims were included in an 1887 book by Nehemiah Matson, Memories of Shaubena. Matson's narrative described St. Vrain's allegedly pleading for his life with Little Bear. Matson, Stevens and John H. Kinzie all identified St. Vrain's assailants as Sac.

On the other hand, Perry A. Armstrong's 1887 history dismissed the idea that The Little Bear had adopted Felix St. Vrain. Armstrong denied that Little Bear had never existed as a Sauk or Fox chief, and thought it preposterous that a Sauk chief would have adopted St. Vrain as a brother.

== Aftermath ==
According to the New Galenian the three men who evaded the band that attacked the St. Vrain party, Floyd, Higgenbotham and Kenney, arrived in Galena at 7 a.m. on May 26, 1832. They provided their own description of events which the newspaper account detailed. However, at least one source indicated that Floyd was a victim of the massacre and his remains are interred in the cemetery with the other victims of the massacre at a public park within Kellogg's Grove near present-day Kent, Illinois. Public and military records, however, confirm that Aquilla Floyd was discharged from the militia on August 20, 1832, and returned to his home in Warren County, Kentucky, where he died of old age in next-door Edmonson County, Kentucky November 1879. His remains are not buried at the monument with the others, and his name on the monument is a mistake made in 1886 when the monument was erected. It is probable that it was assumed he was killed during the battles because no record could be found of him in Iowa, since he had returned to Kentucky after discharge.

Following the massacre a detachment led by Colonel Henry Dodge buried the bodies of St. Vrain and some of the other victims. Though Dodge and his men recovered the remains of St. Vrain, Hale and Fowler, the body of Aaron Hawley was never recovered.

== See also ==
- List of homicides in Illinois
