= Lyalovo =

Lyalovo Льялово
- Village
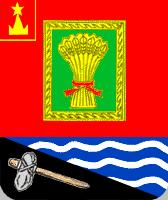
- Coat of arms
- Interactive map of Lyalovo
- Location of Lyalovo Lyalovo (Moscow Oblast)
- Coordinates: 56°02′52″N 37°13′50″E
- Country: Russia
- Federal subject: Moscow Oblast
- Administrative district: Solnechnogorsky District
- Work SettlementSelsoviet: Mendeleyevo

Population
  - Estimate (2010): 837 )

Municipal status
  - Municipal district: Solnechnogorsky Municipal District
  - Urban settlement: Mendeleyevo Urban Settlement
- Time zone: UTC+3 (MSK)
- Postal code: 141570
- OKTMO ID: 46771000453

Lyalovo (Russian: Лья́лово) is a rural locality (a village) under the administrative jurisdiction of Mendeleyevo Work Settlement in Solnechnogorsky District of Moscow Oblast, Russia. It is located on high left bank of the Klyazma River about 10 kilometers (6.2 mi) from its source, 1 kilometer (0.62 mi) from Mendeleyevo, and about 3 kilometers (1.9 mi) from Zelenograd.

== Etymology ==
The name "Lyalovo" supposedly originates from an Old Slavonic or a Uralic word lyalo (льяло), which means a body of a boat upturned, or a shape similar to such body. The hill on which the village is located resembles this shape.

== History ==
Lyalovo is believed to be one of the most ancient populated places in Moscow Oblast. Several settlements were discovered near this village, with the oldest of them dating back as far as four thousand years.

Morozovka country estate, currently transformed into a VIP rest home, is located in Lyalovo. This country estate has been in the hands of multiple well known Russian owners. In the 1800s, it was owned by the Romodanovsky and Princes Beloselsky-Belozersky. (Prince Esper Alexandrovich Belosselsky-Belozersky is buried in the church at Lyalovo having succumbed to typhoid fever in 1846, which was epidemic during that year. He contracted the fever while inspecting the newly built Petersburg-Moscow railroad, for which he was the chief of police). Before the Russian Revolution, the estate belonged to the famous family of Morozovs—one of the richest Russian merchant families.

A Church of the Nativity of the Theotokos is also located in Lyalovo. A number of the former estate owners' family members are buried in the church krypt and grounds. During the Soviet times, the estate was a "Sanatorium" as part of the "ZIK" complex of the party machine. Since 1992, Gazprom is the proprietor.

== Coat of arms ==
The current coat of arms of Lyalovo was established in 1989. It shows a picture of a sheaf, symbolizing one of the first rural picture galleries in Russia that was established there, on a red background symbolizing the Battle of Moscow. The blue waves in the bottom signify the river Klyazma and the stone axe symbolizes the Neolithic settlements found there. The Kremlin tower in the upper-left corner shows that the village belongs to Moscow Oblast.
