= 70th Rifle Division =

- Red Army insignia
- Active: 1st formation: 1934–16 October 1942; 2nd formation: April 1943–January 1947
- Country: Soviet Union
- Branch: Red Army (Soviet Army from 1946)
- Type: Infantry
- Engagements: 1st formation: Winter War German-Soviet War: Siege of Leningrad; 2nd formation: Battle of Smolensk (1943); Operation Bagration; Riga Offensive; Battle of Memel; Battle of Königsberg; Samland Offensive
- Decorations: Order of Lenin (1st formation); Order of Suvorov 2nd class (2nd formation)
- Battle honours: Upper Dnieper (2nd formation)

Commanders
- Notable commanders: Mikhail Kirponos (1st formation)

The 70th Rifle Division (Russian: 70-я стрелковая дивизия, romanized: 70-ya strelkovaya diviziya) was an infantry division of the Red Army and briefly of the Soviet Army, formed twice.

Formed in 1934 at Samara, the division was transferred to the Leningrad Military District in the late 1930s and fought in the Winter War, receiving the Order of Lenin for its participation in the breakthrough of the Mannerheim Line at the end of the war. After the beginning of Operation Barbarossa on 22 June 1941, the German invasion of the Soviet Union, the division was relocated south and participated in counterattacks against the German advance at Soltsy in early July. After the beginning of the siege of Leningrad the division defended the line of the Neva, capturing the Nevsky Pyatachok during the Sinyavino Offensive of September 1942. For this action it became the 45th Guards Rifle Division in mid-October.

The division was reformed in April 1942 at Kaluga from the 47th and 146th Rifle Brigades. It fought in the Battle of Smolensk in mid-1943, then advanced into eastern Belarus. In mid-1944 the division broke through German defenses during Operation Bagration, advancing towards the Baltic during the Riga Offensive. From late 1944 to the end of the war it fought in East Prussia in the Battle of Memel, the Battle of Königsberg, and the Samland Offensive. Postwar, it performed garrison duty in Pomerania before being disbanded in early 1947.

== First formation ==
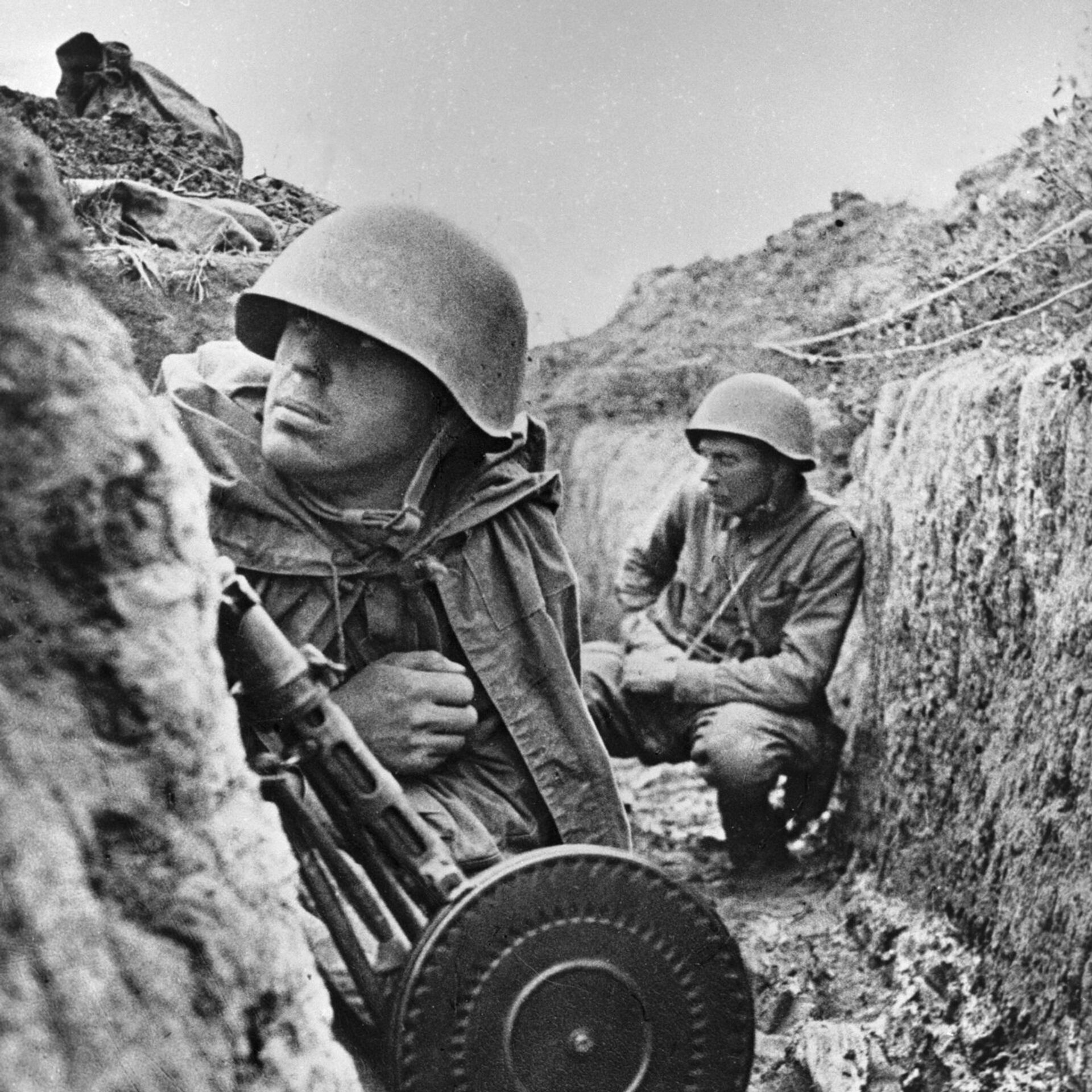
Leningrad Front soldiers before an offensive, September 1941

The division was formed in March 1934 at Samara (renamed Kuybyshev in 1935) in the Volga Military District, as a replacement for the 34th Rifle Division when the latter transferred to the Soviet Far East. It included the 208th, 209th, and 210th Rifle Regiments, as well as the 70th Artillery Regiment. The specialized communications, sapper, reconnaissance, and tank battalions of the 70th shared the number of the division. Under the command of Kombrig Shmyrov, it was transferred to the Leningrad Military District and relocated to Chyornaya Rechka on the Finnish border in 1936. From 1939 it included the 68th, 252nd, and 329th Rifle Regiments, the 227th Howitzer Artillery Regiment, and the 221st Light Artillery Regiment. The division fought in the Winter War as part of the 7th Army from late 1939 to early 1940. For its "courage and exemplary fulfillment of command tasks" during the breakthrough of the Mannerheim Line at the end of the Winter War the division received the Order of Lenin on 21 March 1940; the 252nd Rifle and 227th Howitzer Artillery Regiments received the Order of the Red Banner on 11 April. 1,500 soldiers of the division were decorated, and sixteen received the title Hero of the Soviet Union, including the division commander, Mikhail Kirponos. After the end of the Winter War the division became part of the 50th Rifle Corps of the 23rd Army in the Leningrad Military District, defending the Karelian Isthmus.

After Operation Barbarossa, the German invasion of the Soviet Union, began on 22 June 1941, the division became part of the Northern Front, which was formed from the Leningrad Military District on 24 June. The 70th was fully mobilized before it went to the front, numbering 14,000 men and 200 artillery pieces and mortars. At the beginning of July 1941 it was transferred to the 11th Army of the Northwestern Front, and first entered combat against German troops on the left bank of the Shelon River, near the town of Soltsy. In three days of heavy fighting it counterattacked the 6th Panzer Division, but was forced to retreat to the Luga–Dno line. During August, as part of the Novgorod Army Operational Group and later the 48th Army from 4 August, it fought in fierce fighting in the area of Soltsy, Shimsk, and Medved. When the 70th was transferred to the 48th Army the latter fielded 6,235 men and 31 guns. Later that month it defended the southern approaches to Leningrad in the Kolpino direction.

The 70th fought in fierce defense battles in the area of Kolpino, Pushkin, Pulkovo, Krasny Bor, and Ust-Tosno, among others, between September and April 1942 as part of the 55th Army of the Leningrad Front during the siege of Leningrad. Between late 1941 and early 1942 the division was reorganized according to the wartime tables of organization; the 221st Artillery Regiment was disbanded on 20 December and the 227th Howitzer Artillery Regiment became the divisional artillery regiment. The 382nd Divisional Mortar Battalion provided additional fire support. It was transferred to the newly recreated second formation of the Neva Operational Group in June. During the Sinyavino Offensive, an attempt to break the siege, the division overcame fierce German resistance to cross the Neva River on the night of 26 September, capturing the Nevsky Pyatachok bridgehead. For its "courage and exemplary fulfillment of command tasks", the division was made an elite Guards unit, becoming the 45th Guards Rifle Division on 16 October 1942.

== Second formation ==
The division was reformed from the 47th and 146th Rifle Brigades in April 1943 at Kaluga in the Moscow Military District, under the command of Lezgin Colonel Makhmud Abilov. It was soon transferred to the 3rd Reserve Army of the Reserve of the Supreme High Command for training. It included an order of battle similar to the final composition of the first formation, with the 68th, 252nd, and 329th Rifle Regiments, and the 227th Artillery Regiment. From July, initially as part of the 21st Army (redesignated from the 3rd Reserve Army), and later with the 33rd Army of the Western Front, the 70th fought in the Spas-Demensk Offensive during the Smolensk Strategic Offensive. It then held defensive positions on the Pronya River. The division was transferred to the 49th Army in September, breaking through the German defenses to cross the Desna and Sozh Rivers before taking defensive positions southeast of Orsha. Between 9 February and 21 March the division was temporarily commanded by Colonel Kornily Rakhmanov, while it was part of the 113th Rifle Corps, holding defensive positions on the Pronya on the line of Blazhki and Polyashitsa. The 70th did not conduct active combat operations during this period and engaged in improving its positions. Rakhmanov became deputy commander when Abilov returned to the division.

The division was transferred to the 62nd Rifle Corps of the 33rd Army of the 2nd Belorussian Front in late April. Colonel Mikhail Kolesnikov replaced Abilov in command of the division on 29 May. Transferred to the 3rd Belorussian Front on 6 July, the division fought in the Mogilev Offensive and the Minsk Offensive during Operation Bagration, the Soviet strategic offensive in Belorussia during mid-1944. The 70th broke through German defenses at the fortified villages of Morozovka and Polyanitsa, pursuing retreating German troops towards Gorki and Volosevichi. The division crossed the Dnieper and captured Gorki and Shklov, destroying an encircled German group in the area east of the fortified village of Volma to the east of Minsk. 252nd Rifle Regiment telephonist Yefreytor Tatyana Baramzina was posthumously made a Hero of the Soviet Union for her actions on 5 July. For "exemplary fulfillment of command tasks" the division received the honorific Upper Dnieper on 10 July 1944, although Kolesnikov was dismissed from command ten days later.

Colonel Serafim Krasnovsky became division commander on 25 July, leading it for the rest of the war. The division advanced westwards through Belorussia as part of the 62nd Rifle Corps of the 33rd Army. After two months on the offensive, by 18 August, the strength of the average rifle company in the division was less than 50 men, 40% of the authorized strength. It was transferred to the reserve of the 1st Baltic Front in late August, fighting in the Riga Offensive as part of the 19th Rifle Corps of the front's 43rd Army from September, during which it broke through German defenses southeast of the city. For this action, the 70th was awarded the Order of Suvorov, 2nd class on 22 October. Between November and January 1945, the division fought in the area of Memel, initially with the 43rd Army and later with the 4th Shock Army, reaching the Curonian Lagoon and capturing Memel on 28 January. After the capture of Memel, the 70th defended the coast of the bay, responsible for an 80 kilometer sector, in the reserve of the Samland Group of Forces of the 3rd Belorussian Front. In March and April the division, again with the 43rd Army, this time with the 90th Rifle Corps, fought in the Battle of Königsberg and the Samland Offensive, participating in the storming of the former. The army transferred to the 2nd Belorussian Front in late April, but remained in East Prussia until the end of the war.

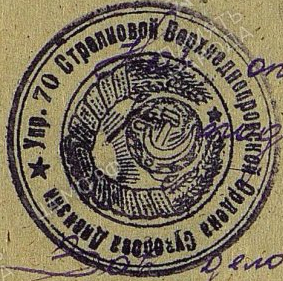
Official handstamp used by the headquarters of the second formation to authenticate documents, example from late 1946

After the end of the war, the division, still part of the 43rd Army, became part of the Northern Group of Forces in Poland, guarding the coast of Pomerania near Gdynia. The division headquarters was first located in the largest administrative building in the central square of the city. Elements of the division were gradually transferred to permanent bases around Lauenburg. It conducted combat training, while new recruits replaced veterans, who were demobilized. The division was disbanded in January 1947.

== Commanders ==
The division's first formation was commanded by the following officers:

- Major General Andrey Fedyunin (1 July 1940–15 July 1941)
- Major (promoted to Colonel 8 November 1941) Vyacheslav Yakutovich (16 July–21 December 1941)
- Colonel Yevgeny Tsukanov (9 January–7 April 1942)
- Colonel Anatoly Krasnov (8 April–16 October 1942)

The division's second formation was commanded by the following officers:

- Colonel Makhmud Abilov (14 April 1943–9 February 1944)
- Colonel Kornily Rakhmanov (10 February–12 March 1944)
- Colonel Makhmud Abilov (15 March–27 May 1944)
- Colonel Mikhail Kolesnikov (28 May–17 July 1944)
- Colonel Serafim Krasnovsky (22 July 1944–after 9 May 1945)
