= 142nd Pennsylvania Infantry Regiment =

Union Army volunteer infantry regiment

142nd Pennsylvania Volunteer Infantry
- Pennsylvania flag
- Active: August 1862 to May 29, 1865
- Country: United States
- Allegiance: Union
- Branch: Infantry
- Size: 935
- Engagements: Battle of Fredericksburg; Battle of Gettysburg; Battle of Five Forks; Second Battle of Petersburg; Battle of Five Forks; Battle of Appomattox Court House

Commanders
- Colonel of the Regiment: Robert P. Cummins; Horatio N. Warren
- Notable commanders: Robert P. Cummins

The 142nd Pennsylvania Volunteer Infantry was a volunteer infantry regiment that fought in the Union Army during the American Civil War. The regiment primarily served in the Army of the Potomac in the Eastern Theater and was heavily engaged in the first day of fighting at Gettysburg.

== History ==
The regiment was organized in August 1862, with Robert P. Cummins as colonel, Alfred B. McCalmont as lieutenant colonel, and John Bradley as major. It was sent to Washington, D.C., where it built fortifications. After a couple of weeks, it was sent to Frederick, Maryland, where it performed garrison duties.

In October, it became part of the 2nd Brigade of the Pennsylvania Reserves. At the Battle of Fredericksburg, the regiment formed part of the force which briefly pierced the Confederate right, losing 250 out of 550 men, including Major Bradley, who was mortally wounded. After the battle, the Reserves division was sent back to Washington, and the regiment was reassigned to the 1st Brigade, Third Division, I Corps.

At the Battle of Gettysburg in July 1863, the unit fought first on McPherson's Ridge and then on Seminary Ridge before being driven back to Cemetery Hill only after being outflanked by Confederate North Carolina divisions on its left and right flanks. Only 140 men had made it back to Union lines, and Colonel Cummins was mortally wounded. During the next two days, the 142nd was only lightly engaged. After the battle, the regiment became part of the 3rd Brigade, Fourth Division, V Corps.

In September 1864, Horatio N. Warren was promoted to colonel of the regiment. It fought throughout the Overland Campaign and the Siege of Petersburg, mostly against the Wilmington and Weldon Railroad. After the surrender at Appomattox Court House, the regiment participated in the Grand Review of the Armies in Washington and was mustered out on May 29, 1865.

== Casualties ==
- Total enrollment: 935
- Killed and died of wounds: 7 officers and 133 enlisted men
- Wounded: 21 officers and 409 enlisted men
- Died of disease, etc.: 81 enlisted men
- Captured and missing: 2 officers and 156 enlisted men
- Total loss: 809.

The casualty information presented above is as inscribed on the back of the 142nd's monument on the battlefield at Gettysburg National Military Park in Adams County, Pennsylvania. According to Fox's Regimental Losses, the 142nd PVI suffered the ninth highest percentage of combat fatalities in the entire Union army.

== Notable members ==
- George R. Snowden, commanded Company I as a captain. Later became a major general as commander of the Pennsylvania National Guard Division.

== Reenactors ==
Two Civil War reenacting organizations portray companies of the 142nd Pennsylvania. A group portraying Company G is based in Stroudsburg, Pennsylvania. Another group, portraying Company F, is based in the Gettysburg, Pennsylvania area.
