= George R. Snowden =

American lawyer and military officer (1841–1932)

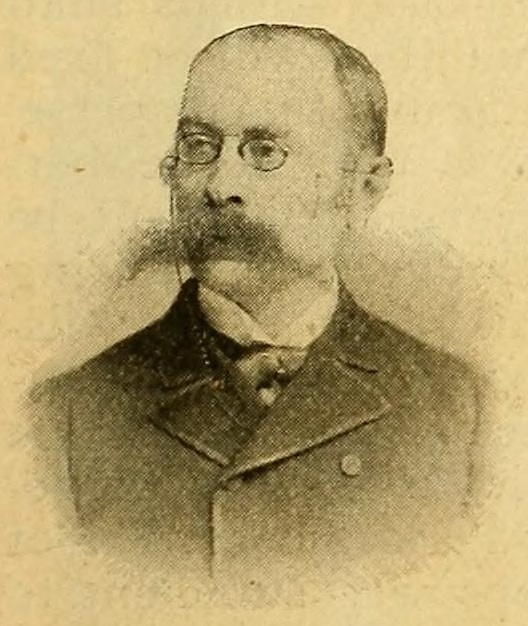
- Born: George Randolph Snowden; February 12, 1841; Franklin, Pennsylvania, US
- Died: April 21, 1932 (aged 91); Philadelphia, Pennsylvania, US
- Burial place: Franklin Cemetery; Franklin, Pennsylvania
- Military career
- Allegiance: United States of America
- Branch: United States Army
- Service years: 1862–1900
- Rank: Major general
- Unit: Pennsylvania Army National Guard
- Commands: Company I, 142nd Pennsylvania Infantry; 3rd Infantry Regiment, Pennsylvania National Guard; 1st Brigade, Pennsylvania National Guard Division; Pennsylvania National Guard Division
- Conflicts: American Civil War; Battle of Antietam; Battle of Fredericksburg; Battle of Chancellorsville; Battle of Gettysburg
- Other work: Attorney

George Randolph Snowden (February 12, 1841 – April 21, 1932) was an American lawyer and military officer who served as commander of the organization now known as the 28th Infantry Division.

== Early life ==
Snowden was born on February 12, 1841, in Franklin, Pennsylvania. He was educated locally, studied law, and was admitted to the bar in 1862.

== Civil War ==
In August 1862, Snowden enlisted in the unit which was later designated Company I, 142nd Pennsylvania Infantry. He was commissioned as a first lieutenant in September, became the company commander in 1863, and took part in the battles of Antietam, Fredericksburg, Chancellorsville and Gettysburg. He was a captain when he was discharged in April 1864.

== Post-Civil War ==
Snowden practiced law in Franklin until relocating to Philadelphia in 1874 and was active in local businesses including the Franklin Gas Company. He also continued his military service as a member of the Pennsylvania National Guard.

Snowden served as commander of the 3rd Infantry Regiment with the rank of colonel, and took part in the military response in Pittsburgh during the Great Railroad Strike of 1877. In 1878 he was promoted to Brigadier General as commander of the 1st Brigade.

Besides practicing law, Snowden also served in appointive offices, including Assistant Customs Appraiser for the Port of Philadelphia and Chief Clerk of Philadelphia's United States Mint. When the federal government began to enact civil service reform, Snowden served on the board of examiners for the Philadelphia Customs office. In 1880, he was an unsuccessful Democratic Party candidate for Congress, and he later served on Philadelphia's Select Council. (At the time, the city's legislative functions were carried out by two bodies, the Select Council and the Common Council.)

== Later career ==
In 1890, Snowden was promoted to major general as commander of the Pennsylvania National Guard Division, succeeding John F. Hartranft. At the time, the division consisted of three brigades and various separate units.

Snowden commanded the National Guard during the Homestead Strike in July 1892. He sided with the Carnegie Steel owners over the striking union workers, saying "Pennsylvanians can hardly appreciate the actual communism of these people. They believe the works are theirs quite as much as Carnegie's".

The militia's efforts to curtail the activities of striking workers enabled the owners to reopen with non-union labor.

== Retirement ==
Snowden retired from the military in 1900 and was succeeded as division commander by Charles Miller. In his later years Snowden was one of Philadelphia's Real Estate Assessors. He was active in the Grand Army of the Republic and Military Order of the Loyal Legion of the United States. He took part in numerous Union Army reunions, as well as the dedication of several monuments and memorials.

Snowden was also active in fraternal and civic organizations, including the Masons and the Sons of the American Revolution.

Snowden wrote on military subjects and other topics and was a popular public speaker. Some of his speeches were republished as articles or pamphlets. In 1971, portions of his Civil War diary were published as Home to Franklin! Excerpts from the Civil War Diary of George Randolph Snowden.

== Personal life and death ==
Snowden never married, and had no children. He died on April 21, 1932, in Philadelphia. He was buried in Franklin Cemetery in the city of Franklin, Section D, Lot 19. In 1869, he had been an original incorporator of the cemetery.
