= Hugh O'Donnell (labor leader) =

American steel mill worker and labor leader

Photo of Hughey O'Donnell as he appeared around the time of the Homestead Strike.

Hugh O'Donnell (c. 1869–1935) was an American steel mill worker and labor leader. He is best remembered as the chairman of the Homestead Strike Advisory Committee during the Homestead Steel Strike of July 1892.

== Biography ==
=== Early years ===
Hugh O'Donnell came to work at the Carnegie Steel Company works at Homestead, Pennsylvania in 1886, at the age of 17. After 6 months in the sheet metal mill he moved to the Homestead works' mill which produced 119-inch steel plate, in which he worked as a heater.

O'Donnell joined the Amalgamated Association of Iron and Steel Workers and was a member of that organization's Lodge No. 125.

At the time of the Homestead labor dispute, O'Donnell was employed as a mill worker, and not as a professional trade union functionary.

=== Leadership of the Homestead strike ===
Drawing of O'Donnell from the front page of the Wilkes-Barre Evening News during the time of the strike.

O'Donnell was named chairman of the Advisory Committee, the workers' organization in charge of coordination of the strike. In this capacity he had cautioned against violence and trespassing upon company property in an attempt to keep the company from availing itself of judicial injunction or the seizing of the moral high ground.

The Advisory Committee established its headquarters on the third floor of the Bost Building, located at the corner of Eighth Avenue and Heisel Street in Homestead.

=== Events of July 6 ===
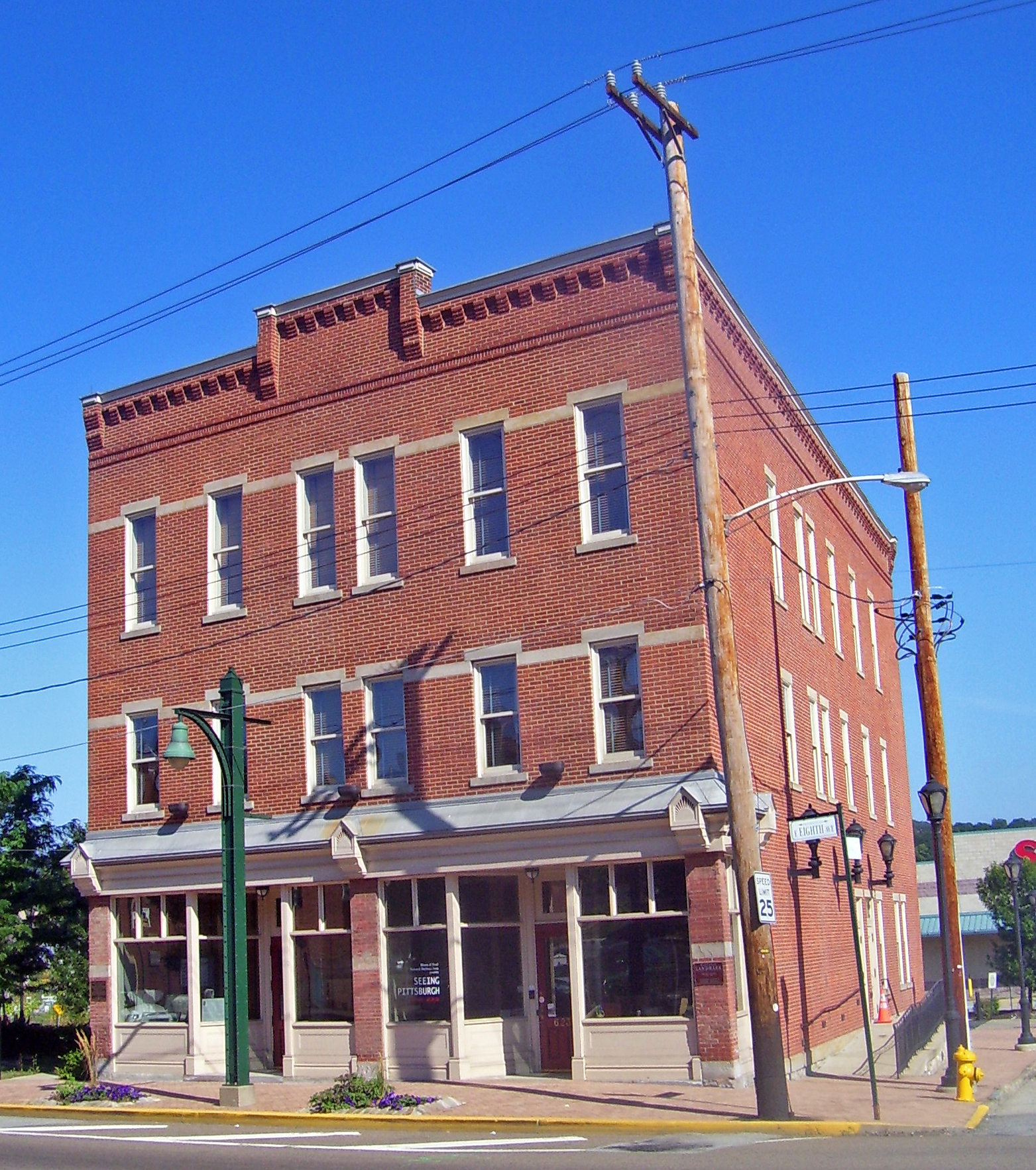
Union leaders made their headquarters on the third floor of the Bost Building in Homestead, now the site of a labor history museum.

At 10:30 pm on July 5, 1892, some 300 employees of the Pinkerton National Detective Agency arrived by rail at Bellevue, about five miles south of Pittsburgh along the Ohio River. These were put aboard two specially equipped barges, laden with 300 pistols and 250 Winchester rifles, and pulled by tugboat up the river to Homestead. Strike leaders, who assigned lookouts to keep a watch along rivers and rail routes, were apprised by telegram at 2:30 am of July 6 that barges had departed for the steel works and ten minutes later a warning alarm was sounded, echoed by whistles throughout the town.

Chaos ensued and O'Donnell immediately lost control of the defense of the steelworks, which was spontaneously led by residents of Homestead. Armed strikers assembled at the steelworks and shots were fired at the tugboat pulling the barges, one of which shattered a window in the pilothouse. Some of those coming forward in impromptu leadership roles included Margaret Finch, the feisty widow of a steelworker who operated the Rolling Mill House saloon, English immigrant laborer William Foy, and open-hearth skilled worker Anthony Soulier.

As dawn began to break at 4:00 am, a crowd had gathered along the riverbank next to a barbed wire fence which ran from the plant to the river, which had been erected by the company some weeks earlier. The barges were pushed ashore at 4:30, to a cascade of angry shouts and a hail of stones, many of which were thrown by the hundreds of wives of strikers who had assembled.

Gangplanks were lowered and William Foy and Capt. Frederick H. Heinde, commander of the Pinkerton landing operation, tensely faced off amidst mutual threats. A fracas erupted, with clubs wielded and shots were fired, with both Foy and Heinde hit by bullets. The Pinkertons began firing their rifles repeatedly into the crowd, with armed strikers answering in kind, and for the next ten minutes a pitched gun battle was waged; several strikers and two Pinkertons were mortally wounded, with dozens of others injured, including Hugh O'Donnell, who was grazed by a bullet to his thumb.

The Pinkertons remained trapped aboard the barges, while O'Donnell and his associates of the Advisory Committee attempted to restore order to the tense and bloody situation, removing wives and wounded strikers from the scene and O'Donnell personally attempting, to the best of his ability, to calm and organize the crowd.

=== After the battle ===
On July 12, 1892, O'Donnell chaired a mass meeting in Homestead which voted unanimously to support the introduction into town of the National Guard, which had been called out by Pennsylvania Governor Robert E. Pattison. The meeting was addressed by Homestead burgess (mayor) John McLuckie, who railed against the Pinkertons as members of a "dirty, filthy, stinking" organization while encouraging reception of the militia "with open arms," since "they are not dangerous so long as the dignity of the state is not insulted."

=== Legal difficulties ===
O'Donnell was arrested in September 1892, charged with conspiracy, aggravated riot, treason, and two counts of murder in connection with the violent battle between Homestead strikers and Pinkerton Detective Agency employees. He was held without bail on the charges, coming to trial on one of the murder charges in February 1893.

O'Donnell was acquitted of the murder charge in a jury trial and was subsequently released on bail. Prosecutors never proceeded to bring O'Donnell to trial on any other offense, and all charges were eventually dropped.

=== Post-strike years ===
In the years after the failure of the Homestead strike, O'Donnell found himself blackballed from returning to work in the steel industry. Needing to adopt a new career, he moved to Philadelphia and took a job as a newspaper reporter.

In about 1903, O'Donnell accepted a position in government employment as a deputy to the Pennsylvania state factory inspector. This job placed O'Donnell in crowded Pennsylvania tenements and poorly ventilated factories on a regular basis, and he subsequently contracted tuberculosis as a result. Stricken seriously ill by the disease, in November 1905 O'Donnell left the Northeast for the warmer and drier climate of the Southwest, accompanied by relatives, in an effort to regain his health. Newspaper accounts from December of that year place O'Donnell in the city of El Paso, Texas.

== See also ==
- Rivers of Steel National Heritage Area
