= International Kissing Day =

Celebration of kissing

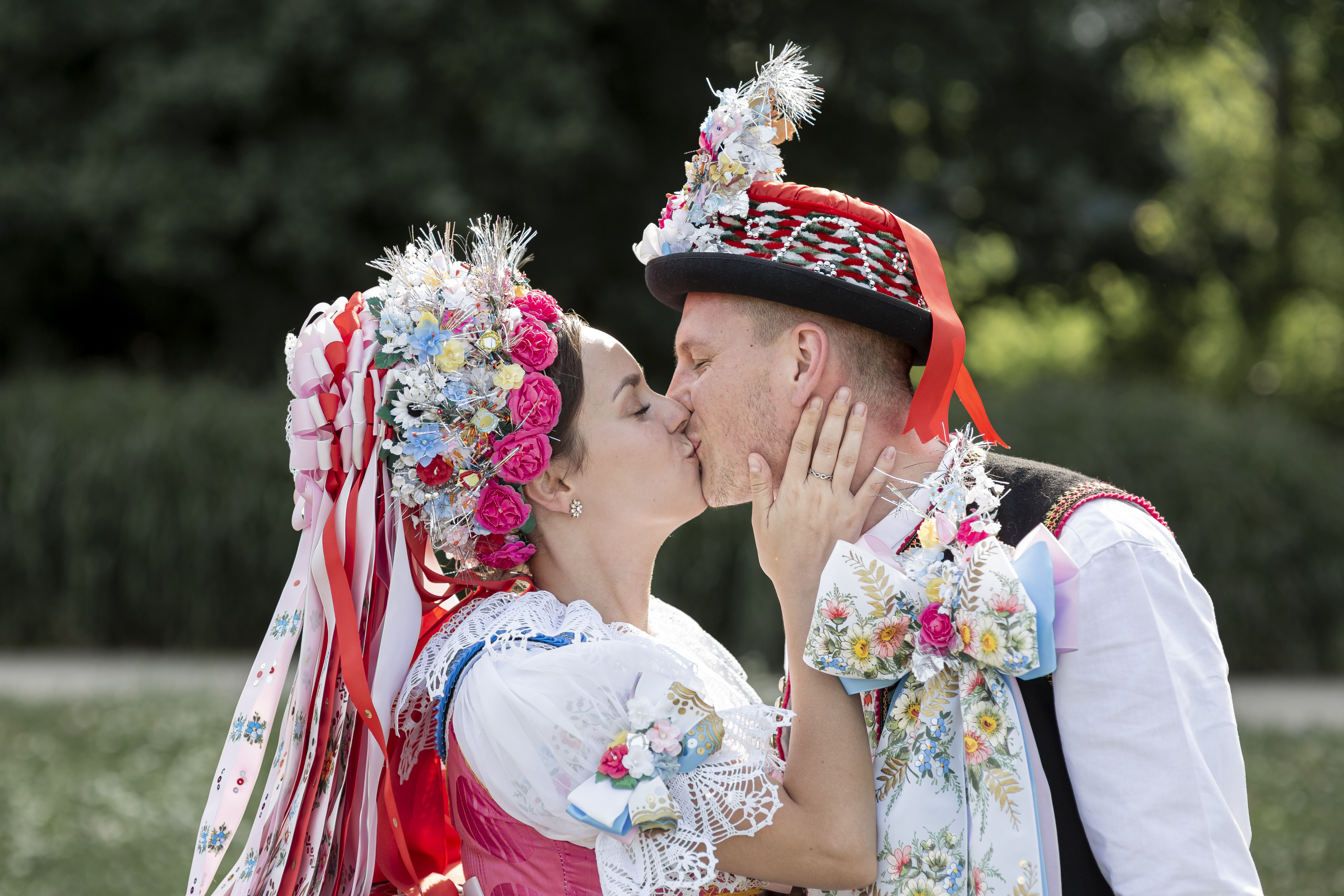
- A couple coming together to kiss
- Also called: World Kiss Day
- Type: International
- Significance: Celebrating the significance and pleasure of kissing
- Date: 6 July
- Frequency: Annual

International Kissing Day or World Kiss Day is an official holiday celebrated each year on July 6. The practice originated in the United Kingdom, and was adopted worldwide in the early 2000s.

Another date, February 14, has also been identified as the International Kiss Day, as it is the romantic holiday Valentine's Day. July 6 is also the observance of the feast of Saint Valentine in the Eastern Orthodox Church.

The concept is that International Kissing Day came about because many people may have forgotten the simple pleasures associated with kissing for kissing's sake, as opposed to kissing as mere social formality or prelude to other activities.
