= Solnechnogorsky District =

Solnechnogorsky District Солнечногорский район (Russian)
- District
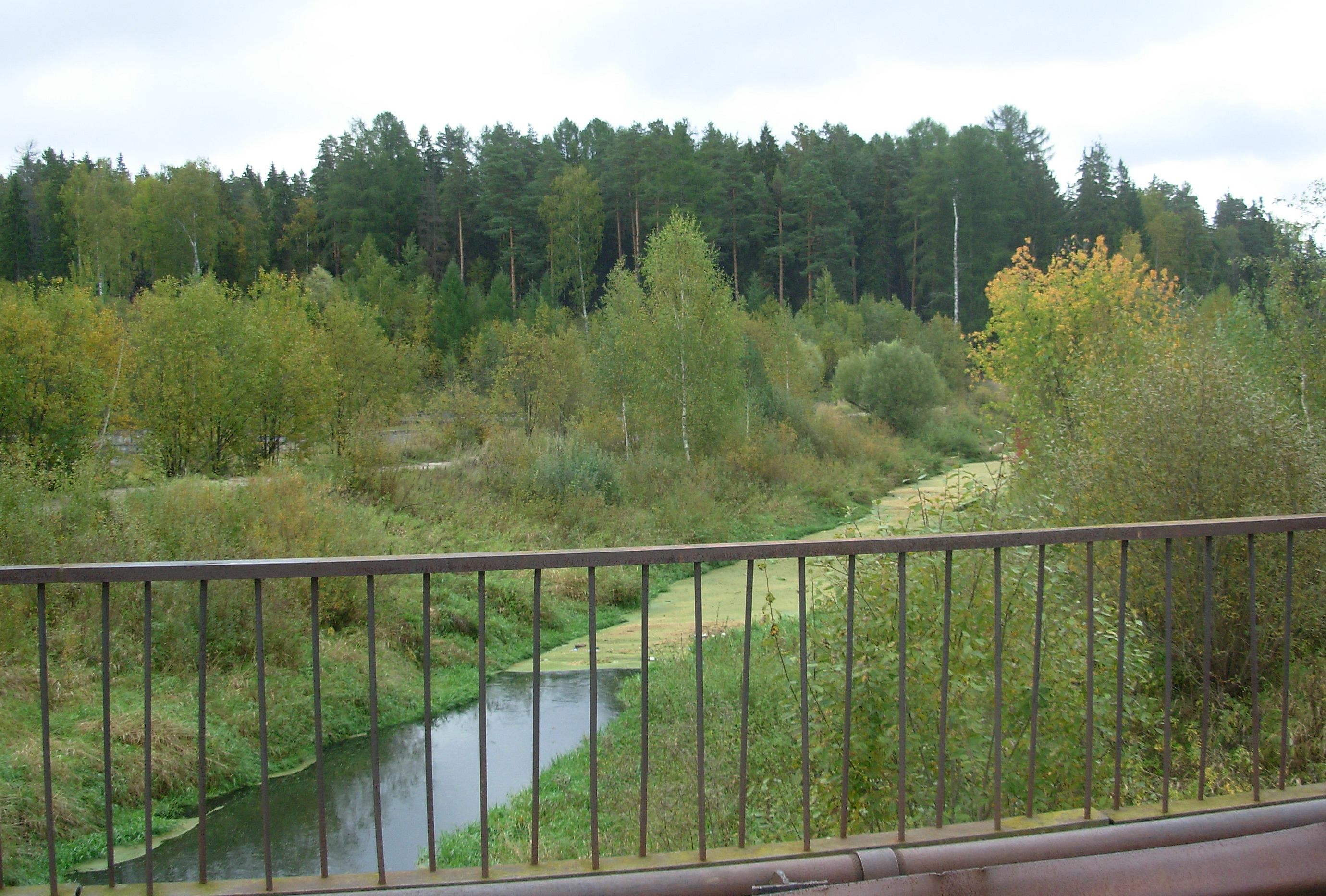
- The Klyazma River in Mendeleyevo, Solnechnogorsky District

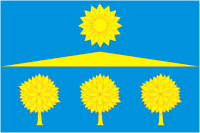
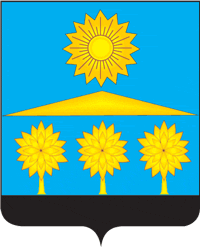
- Flag Coat of arms
- Location of Solnechnogorsky District in Moscow Oblast (before July 2012)
- Coordinates: 56°11′N 36°59′E
- Country: Russia
- Federal subject: Moscow Oblast
- Established: 1929
- Administrative center: Solnechnogorsk

Area
  - Total: 1,135.04 km^{2} (438.24 sq mi)

Population (2010 Census)
  - Total: 128,580
  - Density: 113.28/km^{2} (293.40/sq mi)
  - Urban: 64.5%
  - Rural: 35.5%

Administrative structure
  - Administrative divisions: 1 Towns, 4 Work settlements and suburban settlements, 6 Rural settlements
  - Inhabited localities: 1 cities/towns, 4 urban-type settlements, 193 rural localities

Municipal structure
  - Municipally incorporated as: Solnechnogorsky Municipal District
  - Municipal divisions: 5 urban settlements, 6 rural settlements
- Time zone: UTC+3 (MSK)
- OKTMO ID: 46652000
- Website: http://solreg.ru/

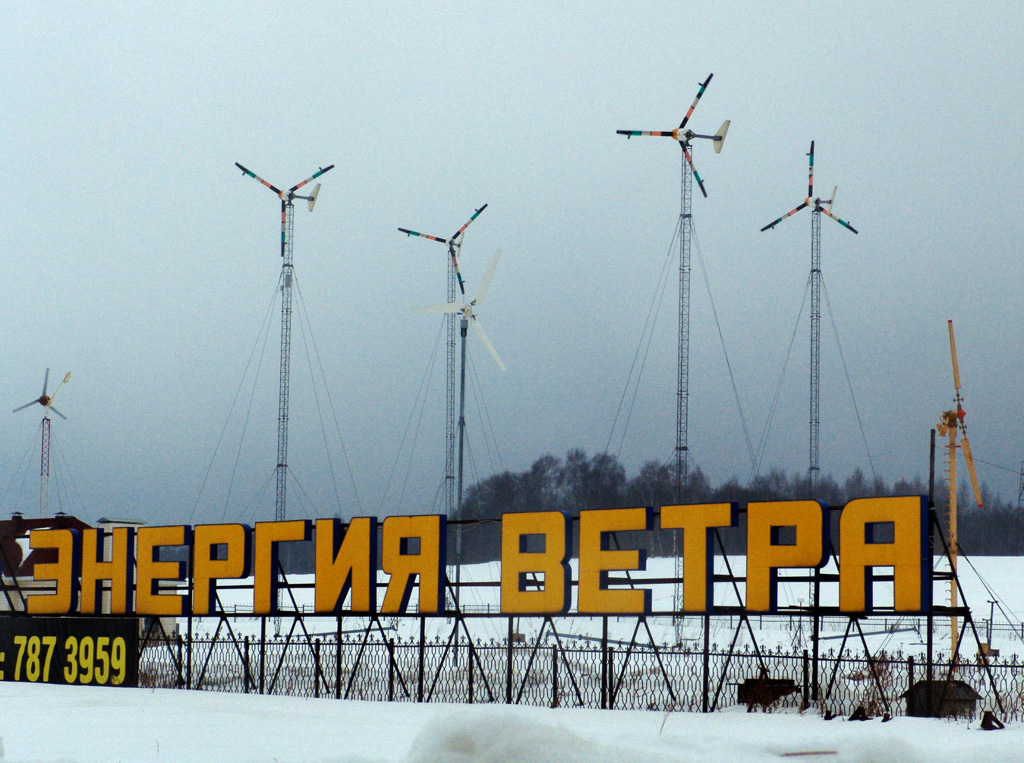
Wind turbines providing power to rural areas far from the national electrical grid

Solnechnogorsky District (Russian: Солнечного́рский райо́н) is an administrative and municipal district (raion), one of the thirty-six in Moscow Oblast, Russia. It is located in the northwest of the oblast. The area of the district is 1,135.04 square kilometers (438.24 sq mi). Its administrative center is the town of Solnechnogorsk. Population: 128,580 (2010 Census); 124,369 (2002 census); 71,832 (1989 Soviet census). The population of Solnechnogorsk accounts for 41.2% of the district's total population.
