= Aeroflot Flight 411 =

1982 aviation accident

Coordinates: 56°01′39″N 37°15′30″E

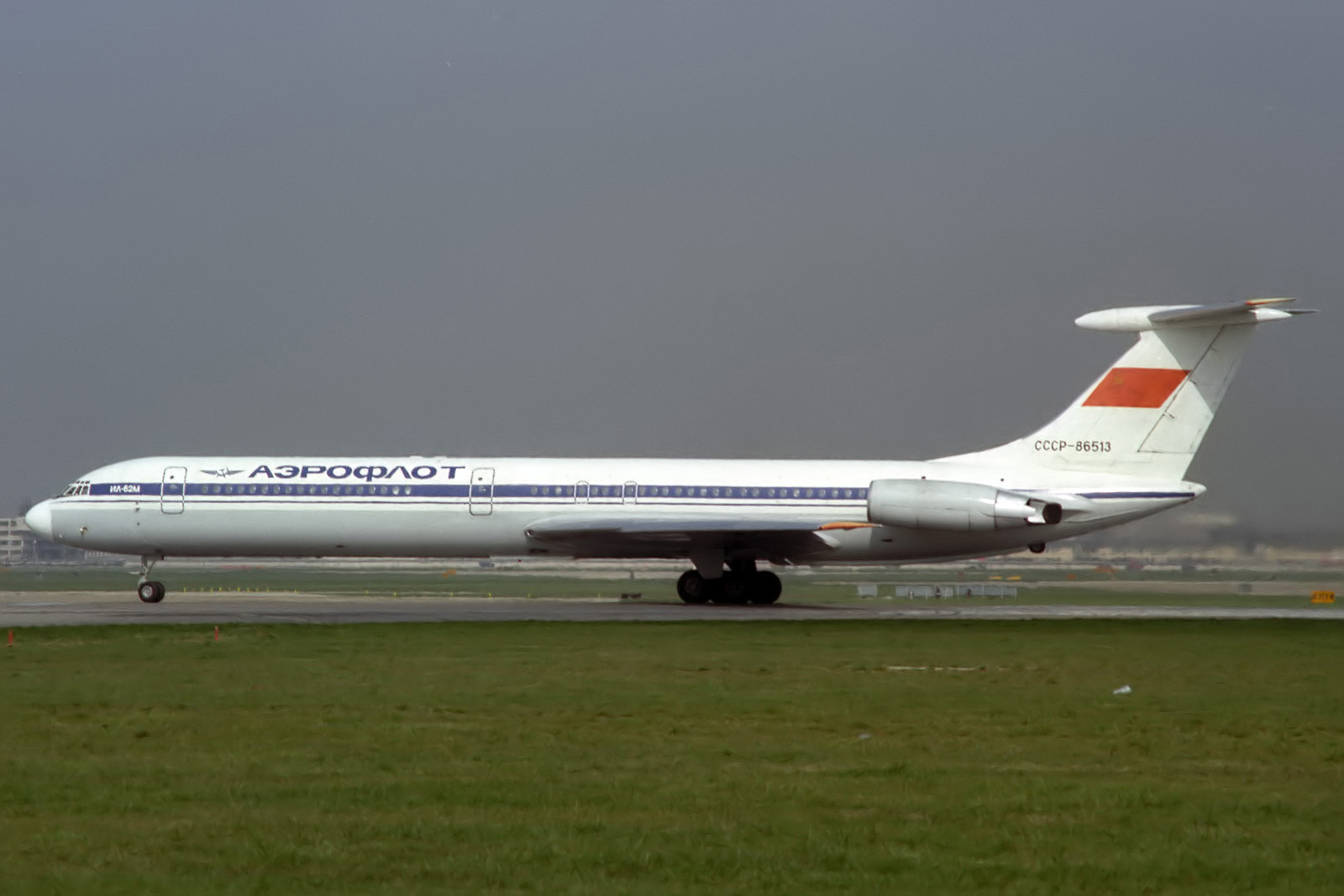
- CCCP-86513, the aircraft involved in the accident, three months before the crash

Accident
- Date: 6 July 1982
- Summary: Low-altitude stall
- Site: Mendeleyevo, Moscow Oblast, Soviet Union

Aircraft
- Aircraft type: Ilyushin Il-62M
- Operator: Aeroflot
- IATA flight No.: SU411
- ICAO flight No.: AFL411
- Call sign: AEROFLOT 411
- Registration: СССР-86513 (Note: The aircraft registration prefix for civil aircraft registered in the Soviet Union was SSSR. In the Russian cyrillic alphabet, the English letter "S" is written as "C" and "R" is written as "P", hence "CCCP" is "SSSR" in cyrillic.)
- Flight origin: Sheremetyevo Airport, Moscow, Soviet Union
- Stopover: Dakar-Yoff International Airport, Dakar, Senegal
- Destination: Freetown, Sierra Leone
- Occupants: 90
- Passengers: 80
- Crew: 10
- Fatalities: 90
- Survivors: 0

Aeroflot Flight 411 was a scheduled flight from Sheremetyevo Airport in Moscow, Soviet Union, to Freetown, Sierra Leone, with a stopover at Dakar-Yoff International Airport in Dakar, Senegal. On 6 July 1982, the Ilyushin Il-62 flying this route crashed and was destroyed by fire after two engines were shut down shortly after take-off. All 90 passengers and crew on board died as a result of the accident.

== Aircraft ==
The accident aircraft was an Ilyushin Il-62M, with registration CCCP-86513. Its first flight was in November 1980 and it had flown slightly more than 4,800 hours prior to the accident. The Il-62's four jet engines are mounted in pairs, on pylons either side of the rear fuselage.

== Accident ==
The aircraft took off from Moscow's Sheremetyevo Airport at 12:33am with 80 passengers and 10 crew on board. Within seconds the engine fire warning for No. 1 engine (Note: Engine No. 1 and Engine No. 2 are paired on the left side of the aircraft.) was annunciated. The crew shut down the engine and discharged the engine fire extinguishers. Less than a minute later the engine fire warning for No. 2 engine was also annunciated and the crew shut this engine down as well. The crew turned the aircraft to return to Sheremetyevo Airport but after the second engine shutdown it was only at an altitude of about 160 metres (520 ft) and a speed of 320 km/h (170 kn; 200 mph). Despite the pilots' efforts to keep it airborne, the aircraft gradually lost height and airspeed until it stalled about 75 metres (246 ft) above the ground. It then crashed in a forested wetland 1.5 kilometres (0.9 mi; 0.8 nmi) east of the town of Mendeleyevo and 11.4 kilometres (7.1 mi; 6.2 nmi) northwest of Sheremetyevo Airport, less than three minutes after takeoff. A passenger from Sierra Leone survived the initial accident and subsequent fire, but died on the evening of 8 July.

== Investigation ==
Post-crash examination of the engines found no pre-crash damage or signs of in-flight fire – the fire warnings were false. The fire warning system was almost completely destroyed by the accident and fire and the reason for the false warnings could not be determined; although there had been nine reported instances of bleed air leaks causing spurious engine fire warnings on Il-62s between 1975 and the date of the accident, this was ruled out as a cause.

The investigation found that it was impossible for the aircraft to maintain altitude on two engines with its flaps set for takeoff and at its weight of 164,514 kilograms (362,691 lb), which was close to the maximum takeoff weight for an Il-62. It found no fault with the pilots' actions, who could not make a forced landing because of the dark and the urban areas on the ground below. The investigation found the pilots had followed flight manual procedures; however, there was no procedure in the flight manual to cover the situation in which they found themselves.
