= Mendeleyevo, Moscow Oblast =

Mendeleyevo Менделе́ево
- Urban-type settlement
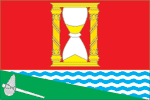
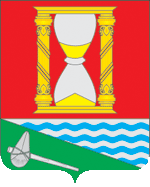
- Flag Coat of arms
- Interactive map of Mendeleyevo
- Location of Mendeleyevo Mendeleyevo (Moscow Oblast)
- Coordinates: 56°02′15″N 37°14′00″E
- Country: Russia
- Federal subject: Moscow Oblast
- Administrative district: Solnechnogorsky District

Population (2010 Census)
  - Total: 7,927
  - Estimate (2025): 6,196 (−21.8%)
- Time zone: UTC+3 (MSK)
- Postal code: 141570
- OKTMO ID: 46771000061

Mendeleyevo (Russian: Менделе́ево) is an urban locality (a work settlement) in Solnechnogorsky District of Moscow Oblast, Russia. It stands on the Klyazma River, about 10 kilometers (6.2 mi) from its source, near the city of Zelenograd, and opposite the ancient Russian village of Lyalovo. Population: 7,927 (2010 census); 8,030 (2002 census); 9,172 (1989 Soviet census).

It was founded in 1957 as a closed town associated with the All-Union (now All-Russian) Scientific Research Institute for Physical-Engineering and Radiotechnical Metrology (VNIIFTRI). It is named after the famous Russian chemist Dmitry Mendeleyev who was also an eminent metrologist. Although it is no longer officially listed as a Russian naukograd, it remains close to this classification, as the VNIIFTRI scientific institute continues to be one of the most important local employers. Aeroflot Flight 411 crashed near the town in July 1982.
