= 371 BC =

371 BC in various calendars
| Gregorian calendar | 371 BC; CCCLXXI BC |
| Ab urbe condita | 383 |
| Ancient Egypt era | XXX dynasty, 10 |
| Pharaoh | Nectanebo I, 10 |
| Ancient Greek Olympiad (summer) | 102nd Olympiad, year 2 |
| Assyrian calendar | 4380 |
| Balinese saka calendar | N/A |
| Bengali calendar | −964 – −963 |
| Berber calendar | 580 |
| Buddhist calendar | 174 |
| Burmese calendar | −1008 |
| Byzantine calendar | 5138–5139 |
| Chinese calendar | 己酉年 (Earth Rooster); 2327 or 2120 — to — 庚戌年 (Metal Dog); 2328 or 2121 |
| Coptic calendar | −654 – −653 |
| Discordian calendar | 796 |
| Ethiopian calendar | −378 – −377 |
| Hebrew calendar | 3390–3391 |
- Hindu calendars
| Vikram Samvat | −314 – −313 |
| Shaka Samvat | N/A |
| Kali Yuga | 2730–2731 |
| Holocene calendar | 9630 |
| Iranian calendar | 992 BP – 991 BP |
| Islamic calendar | 1022 BH – 1021 BH |
| Javanese calendar | N/A |
| Julian calendar | N/A |
| Korean calendar | 1963 |
| Minguo calendar | 2282 before ROC 民前2282年 |
| Nanakshahi calendar | −1838 |
| Thai solar calendar | 172–173 |
| Tibetan calendar | 阴土鸡年 (female Earth-Rooster) −244 or −625 or −1397 — to — 阳金狗年 (male Iron-Dog) −243 or −624 or −1396 |

Battle of Leuctra

Year 371 BC was a year of the pre-Julian Roman calendar. At the time, it was known as the Fifth year without Tribunate or Consulship (or, less frequently, year 383 Ab urbe condita). The denomination 371 BC for this year has been used since the early medieval period, when the Anno Domini calendar era became the prevalent method in Europe for naming years.

== Events ==
=== By place ===
==== Greece ====
- A fresh peace congress is summoned at Sparta. At the peace conference, the Spartan King Agesilaus II (with the support of Athens) refuses to allow the Thebans to sign the treaty on behalf of all Boeotia. The Theban statesman Epaminondas, who is boeotarch (one of the five magistrates of the Boeotian federation), maintains Thebes' position, even when it leads to the exclusion of Thebes from the peace treaty.
- Thebes' actions at the peace congress lead to a war between Sparta and Thebes. The Spartans have an army stationed on Thebes' western frontier, waiting to follow up their diplomatic success by a crushing military attack. However, at the Battle of Leuctra, the Theban generals, Epaminondas and Pelopidas, win a decisive victory over the Spartans under the other Spartan king, Cleombrotus I (who is killed in the battle). Epaminondas wins the battle with a tactical innovation which involves striking the enemy first at their strongest, instead of their weakest, point, with such crushing force that the attack is irresistible. As a result of this battle, the Boeotian federation is saved.
- Athens does not welcome the Theban victory, fearing the rising aggressiveness of Thebes. After the Theban victory, the old alliance between the Persians and the Thebans is restored.
- With the unexpected defeat of Sparta by the Thebans, the Arcadians decide to re-assert their independence. They rebuild Mantinea, form an Arcadian League and build a new federal city, Megalopolis.
- Agesipolis II succeeds his father Cleombrotus I as king of Sparta.

=== By topic ===
==== Astronomy ====
- It is suggested that the original comet associated with the Kreutz Sungrazers family of comets passes perihelion at this time. It is thought to have been observed by Aristotle and Ephorus during this year.

== Births ==
- Chanakya, Indian philosopher and advisor (approximate date)
- Theophrastus, Greek philosopher

== Deaths ==
- Cleombrotus I, king of Sparta (killed in the Battle of Leuctra)
