= Homestead strike =

1892 labor strike

Homestead Strike
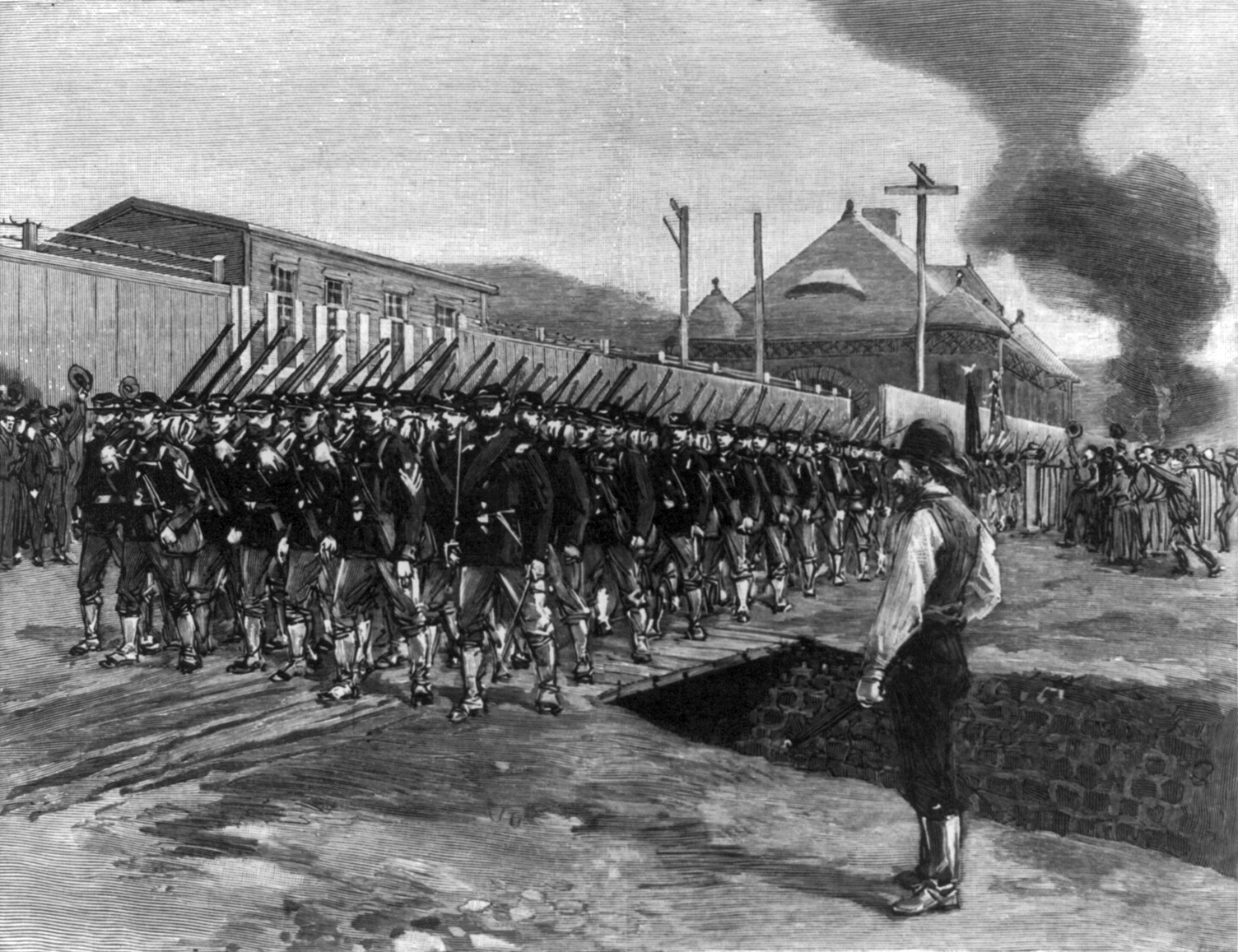
- The Pennsylvania State Militia arrives to quell the hostilities, art by Thure de Thulstrup
- Date: July 1 – November 20, 1892
- Location: Homestead, Pennsylvania, United States
- Goals: No wage decrease
- Result: Defeat of strikers, a major setback to the unionization of steel workers

Parties
Amalgamated Association; Knights of Labor	Carnegie Steel Company; Pinkerton Agency	Pennsylvania State Militia

Lead figures
Hughey O'Donnell (head of strike committee); William Weihe (National President of AA); William A. Carney (Vice-President of AA)	Henry Clay Frick (company operator); Andrew Carnegie (main company owner)	Gov. Robert E. Pattison

Number
c. 6,500	300	6,000

Casualties and losses
Deaths: 7; Injuries: 11	Deaths: 3−8; Injuries: 12–36; Captured: 324	None
Designation markers
- Designations
  Pennsylvania Historical Marker
  - Official name: Homestead Strike
  - Designated: July 1, 1992
  Pennsylvania Historical Marker
  - Official name: Homestead Strike Victims
  - Designated: July 11, 1993
  Pittsburgh Landmark – PHLF
  - Official name: Pinkerton Landing site
  - Designated: 1989

The Homestead strike, also known as the Homestead steel strike, Homestead massacre, or Battle of Homestead, was an industrial lockout and strike that occurred in Pennsylvania in the United States, in 1892. It began on July 1, 1892, culminating in a battle in which strikers defeated private security agents on July 6, 1892. The governor responded by sending in the National Guard to protect strikebreakers. The dispute occurred at the Homestead Steel Works in the Pittsburgh-area town of Homestead, Pennsylvania, between the Amalgamated Association of Iron and Steel Workers (the AA) and the Carnegie Steel Company. The final result was a major defeat for the union strikers and a setback for their efforts to unionize steelworkers. The battle was a pivotal event in U.S. labor history.

== Background ==
Carnegie Steel made major technological innovations in the 1880s, especially the installation of the open-hearth system at Homestead in 1886. It now became possible to make steel suitable for structural beams and for armor plate for the United States Navy, which paid far higher prices for the premium product. In addition, the plant moved increasingly toward the continuous system of production. Carnegie installed vastly improved systems of material-handling, like overhead cranes, hoists, charging machines, and buggies. All of this greatly sped up the process of steelmaking, and allowed the production of vastly larger quantities of the product. As the mills expanded, the labor force grew rapidly, especially with unskilled workers. However, while Carnegie Steel grew and progressed, workers at Homestead were seeing their wages drop.

== Union ==
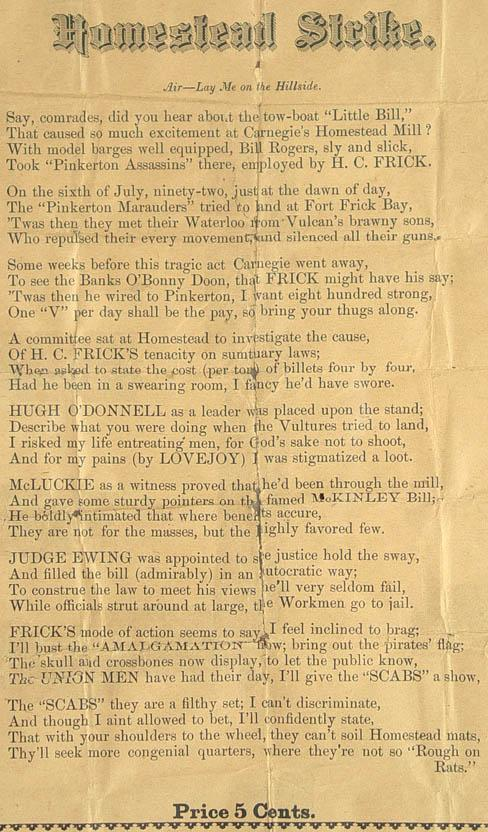
Pro-Union pamphlet with lyrics to a song in support of workers

The Amalgamated Association of Iron and Steel Workers (AA) was an American labor union formed in 1876. It was a craft union representing skilled iron and steelworkers.

The AA's membership was concentrated in ironworks west of the Allegheny Mountains. The union negotiated national uniform wage scales on an annual basis; helped regulate working hours, workload levels and work speeds; and helped improve working conditions. It also acted as a hiring hall, helping employers find scarce puddlers and rollers.

The AA organized the independently owned Pittsburgh Bessemer Steel Works in Homestead in 1881. The AA engaged in a strike at the Homestead works on January 1, 1882, in an effort to prevent management from including a non-union clause in the workers' contracts, known as a "yellow-dog contract". The violence occurred on both sides, and the plant brought in numerous strikebreakers. The strike ended on March 20, in a complete victory for the union.

The AA struck the steel plant again on July 1, 1889, when negotiations for a new three-year collective bargaining agreement failed. The strikers seized the town and once again made common cause with various immigrant groups. Backed by 2,000 townspeople, the strikers drove off a trainload of strikebreakers on July 10. When the sheriff returned with 125 newly deputized agents two days later, the strikers rallied 5,000 townspeople to their cause. Although victorious, the union agreed to significant wage cuts that left tonnage rates less than half those at the nearby Jones and Laughlin works, where technological improvements had not yet been made.

Carnegie officials conceded that the AA essentially ran the Homestead plant after the 1889 strike. The union contract contained 58 pages of footnotes defining work rules at the plant and strictly limited management's ability to maximize output.

For its part, the AA saw substantial gains after the 1889 strike. Membership doubled, and the local union treasury had a balance of $146,000. The Homestead union grew belligerent, and relationships between workers and managers became tense.

== Nature of the 1892 strike ==
The Homestead strike was organized and purposeful, a harbinger of the type of strike which marked the modern age of labor relations in the United States. The AA strike at the Homestead steel mill in 1892 was different from previous large-scale strikes in American history such as the Great Railroad Strike of 1877 or the Great Southwest Railroad Strike of 1886. Earlier strikes had been largely leaderless and disorganized mass uprisings of workers.

== Plans of Carnegie and Frick ==
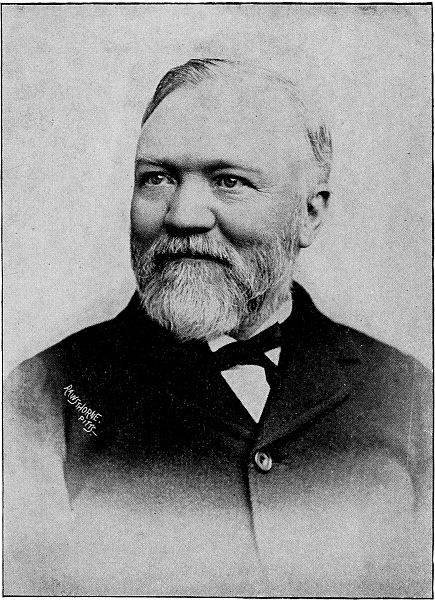
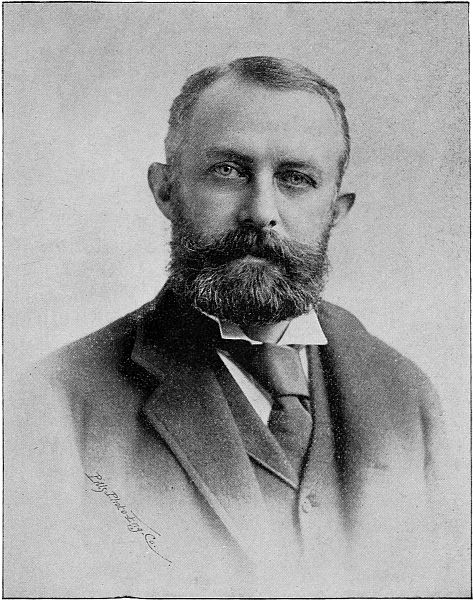
Andrew Carnegie (left) and Henry Clay Frick pictured in c. 1893

Andrew Carnegie placed industrialist Henry Clay Frick in charge of his company's operations in 1881. Frick resolved to break the union at Homestead. "The mills have never been able to turn out the product they should, owing to being held back by the Amalgamated men," he complained in a letter to Carnegie.

Carnegie was publicly in favor of labor unions. He condemned the use of strikebreakers and told associates that no steel mill was worth a single drop of blood. But Carnegie agreed with Frick's desire to break the union and "reorganize the whole affair, and ... exact good reasons for employing every man. Far too many men required by Amalgamated rules." Carnegie ordered the Homestead plant to manufacture large amounts of inventory so the plant could weather a strike. He also drafted a notice (which Frick never released) withdrawing recognition of the union.

With the collective bargaining agreement due to expire on June 30, 1892, Frick and the leaders of the local AA union entered into negotiations in February. With the steel industry doing well and prices higher, the AA asked for a wage increase; the AA represented about 800 of the 3,800 workers at the plant. Frick immediately countered with a 22% wage decrease that would affect nearly half the union's membership and remove a number of positions from the bargaining unit. Carnegie encouraged Frick to use the negotiations to break the union: "...the Firm has decided that the minority must give way to the majority. These works, therefore, will be necessarily non-union after the expiration of the present agreement." Carnegie believed that the Amalgamated was a hindrance to efficiency; furthermore it was not representative of the workers. It admitted only a small group of skilled workers. It was in its own way an elitist, discriminatory organization that was not worthy of the republic, Carnegie felt.

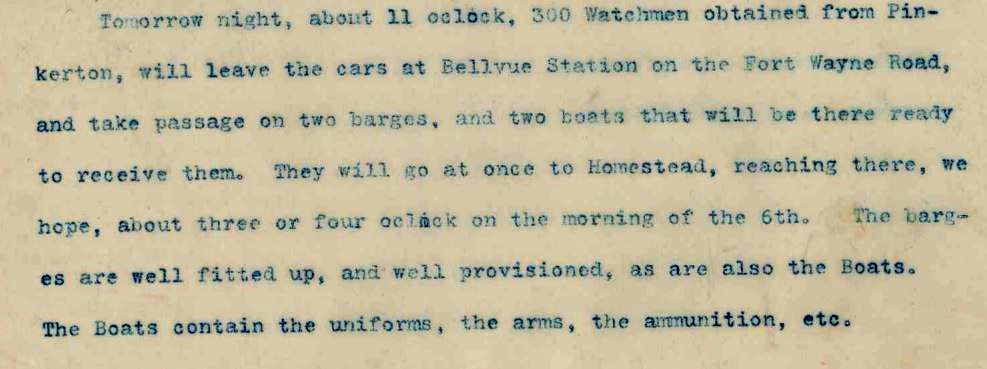
Portion of the typed and signed copy of the letter sent to Andrew Carnegie describing the plans and munitions that would be on the barges when the Pinkertons arrived to confront the strikers in Homestead.

Frick announced on April 30, 1892, that he would bargain for 29 more days. If no contract was reached, Carnegie Steel would cease to recognize the union. Carnegie formally approved Frick's tactics on May 4. Then Frick offered a slightly better wage scale and advised the superintendent to tell the workers, "We do not care whether a man belongs to a union or not, nor do we wish to interfere. He may belong to as many unions or organizations as he chooses, but we think our employees at Homestead Steel Works would fare much better working under the system in vogue at Edgar Thomson and Duquesne."

== Lockout ==
Frick locked workers out of the plate mill and one of the open hearth furnaces on the evening of June 28. When no collective bargaining agreement was reached by June 29, Frick locked the union out of the rest of the plant. A high fence topped with barbed wire, begun in January, was completed and the plant sealed to the workers. Sniper towers with searchlights were constructed near each mill building, and high-pressure water cannons (some capable of spraying boiling-hot liquid) were placed at each entrance. Various aspects of the plant were protected, reinforced, or shielded.

At a mass meeting on June 30, local AA leaders reviewed the final negotiating sessions and announced that the company had broken the contract by locking out workers a day before the contract expired. The Knights of Labor, which had organized the mechanics and transportation workers at Homestead, agreed to walk out alongside the skilled workers of the AA. Workers at Carnegie plants in Pittsburgh, Duquesne, Union Mills and Beaver Falls struck in sympathy the same day.

The Declaration of the Strike Committee, dated July 20, 1892 reads in part,

The employees in the mill of Messrs. Carnegie, Phipps & Co., at Homestead, Pa., have built there a town with its homes, its schools and its churches; have for many years been faithful co-workers with the company in the business of the mill; have invested thousands of dollars of their savings in said mill in the expectation of spending their lives in Homestead and of working in the mill during the period of their efficiency. … "Therefore, the committee desires to express to the public as its firm belief that both the public and the employees aforesaid have equitable rights and interests in the said mill which cannot be modified or diverted without due process of law; that the employees have the right to continuous employment in the said mill during efficiency and good behavior without regard to religious, political or economic opinions or associations; that it is against public policy and subversive of the fundamental principles of American liberty that a whole community of workers should be denied employment or suffer any other social detriment on account of membership in a church, a political party or a trade union; that it is our duty as American citizens to resist by every legal and ordinary means the unconstitutional, anarchic and revolutionary policy of the Carnegie Company, which seems to evince a contempt [for] public and private interests and a disdain [for] the public conscience. . . .

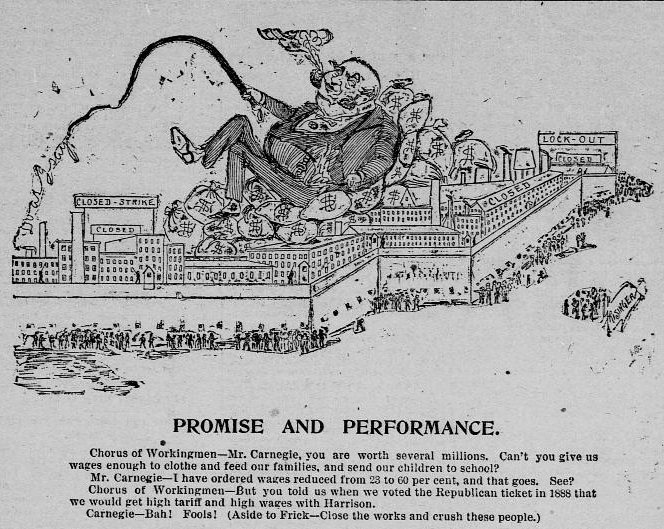
Political cartoon, of boss with whip, which is critical of Andrew Carnegie for lowering wages even though protective tariffs were implemented for industry.

The strikers were determined to keep the plant closed. They secured a steam-powered river launch and several rowboats to patrol the Monongahela River, which ran alongside the plant. Men also divided themselves into units along military lines. Picket lines were thrown up around the plant and the town, and 24-hour shifts established. Ferries and trains were watched. Strangers were challenged to give explanations for their presence in town; if one was not forthcoming, they were escorted outside the city limits. Telegraph communications with AA locals in other cities were established to keep tabs on the company's attempts to hire replacement workers. Reporters were issued special badges which gave them safe passage through the town, but the badges were withdrawn if it was felt misleading or false information made it into the news. Tavern owners were even asked to prevent excessive drinking.

Frick was also busy. The company placed ads for replacement workers in newspapers as far away as Boston, St. Louis and even Europe.

But unprotected strikebreakers would be driven off. On July 4, Frick formally requested that Sheriff William H. McCleary intervene to allow supervisors access to the plant. Carnegie corporation attorney Philander Knox gave the go-ahead to the sheriff on July 5, and McCleary dispatched 11 deputies to the town to post handbills ordering the strikers to stop interfering with the plant's operation. The strikers tore down the handbills and told the deputies that they would not turn over the plant to nonunion workers. Then they herded the deputies onto a boat and sent them downriver to Pittsburgh.

Frick had ordered the construction of a solid board fence topped with barbed wire around mill property. The workers dubbed the newly fortified mill "Fort Frick".

== Battle on July 6 ==
Hughey O'Donnell, Chairman of the Advisory Committee of the Amalgamated Association of Iron and Steel Workers.

Frick's intent was to open the works with nonunion men on July 6. Knox devised a plan to get the Pinkertons onto the mill property. With the mill ringed by striking workers, agents from the Pinkerton National Detective Agency, which Frick had contracted to provide security at the plant in April 1892, planned to access the plant grounds from the river. Three hundred Pinkerton agents assembled on the Davis Island Dam on the Ohio River about five miles below Pittsburgh at 10:30 p.m. on the night of July 5, 1892. They were given Winchester rifles, placed on two specially equipped barges and towed upriver. They were also given badges which read "Watchman, Carnegie Company, Limited". Many had been hired out of lodging houses at $2.50 per day and were unaware of what their assignment was in Homestead.

The strikers were prepared for the Pinkerton agents; the AA had learned of the Pinkertons as soon as they had left Boston for the embarkation point. The small flotilla of union boats went downriver to meet the barges. Strikers on the steam launch fired a few random shots at the barges, then withdrew—blowing the launch whistle to alert the plant. The strikers blew the plant whistle at 2:30 a.m., drawing thousands of men, women and children to the plant.

=== Pinkertons attempt to land ===
The Pinkertons attempted to land under cover of darkness about 4 a.m. A large crowd of families had kept pace with the boats as they were towed by a tug into the town. A few shots were fired at the tug and barges, but no one was injured. The crowd tore down the barbed-wire fence and strikers and their families surged onto the Homestead plant grounds. Some in the crowd threw stones at the barges, but strike leaders shouted for restraint.

The Pinkerton agents attempted to disembark, and more shots were fired. Conflicting testimony exists as to which side fired the first shot in this encounter. (Shooting having begun earlier when the barges were being towed up the river) John T. McCurry, a boatman on the steamboat Little Bill (which had been hired by the Pinkerton Detective Agency to ferry its agents to the steel mill) and one of the men wounded by the strikers, said: "The armed Pinkerton men commenced to climb up the banks. Then the workmen opened fire on the detectives. The men shot first, and not until three of the Pinkerton men had fallen did they respond to the fire. I am willing to take an oath that the workmen fired first, and that the Pinkerton men did not shoot until some of their number had been wounded." But according to The New York Times, the Pinkertons shot first. The newspaper reported that the Pinkertons opened fire and wounded William Foy, a worker. Regardless of which side opened fire first, the first two individuals wounded were Frederick Heinde, captain of the Pinkertons, and Foy. The Pinkerton agents aboard the barges then fired into the crowd, killing two and wounding eleven. The crowd responded in kind, killing two and wounding twelve. The firefight continued for about 10 minutes.

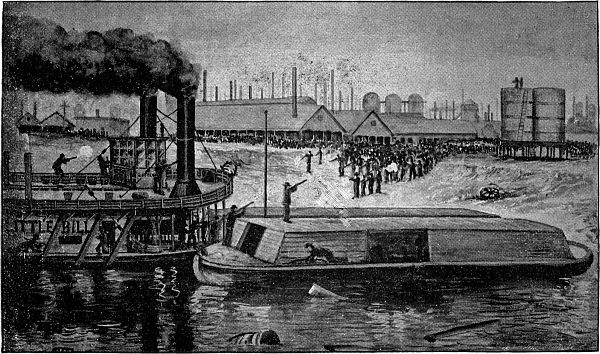
The battle at the landing between the Pinkertons and strikers.

The strikers then huddled behind the pig and scrap iron in the mill yard, while the Pinkertons cut holes in the side of the barges so they could fire on any who approached. The Pinkerton tug departed with the wounded agents, leaving the barges stranded. The strikers soon set to work building a rampart of steel beams further up the riverbank from which they could fire down on the barges. Hundreds of women continued to crowd on the riverbank between the strikers and the agents, calling on the strikers to 'kill the Pinkertons'.

The strikers continued to sporadically fire on the barges. Union members took potshots at the ships from their rowboats and the steam-powered launch. The burgess of Homestead, John McLuckie, issued a proclamation at 6:00 a.m. asking for townspeople to help defend the peace; more than 5,000 people congregated on the hills overlooking the steelworks. A 20-pounder brass cannon was set up on the shore opposite the steel mill, and an attempt was made to sink the barges. Six miles away in Pittsburgh, thousands of steelworkers gathered in the streets, listening to accounts of the attacks at Homestead; hundreds, many of them armed, began to move toward the town to assist the strikers.

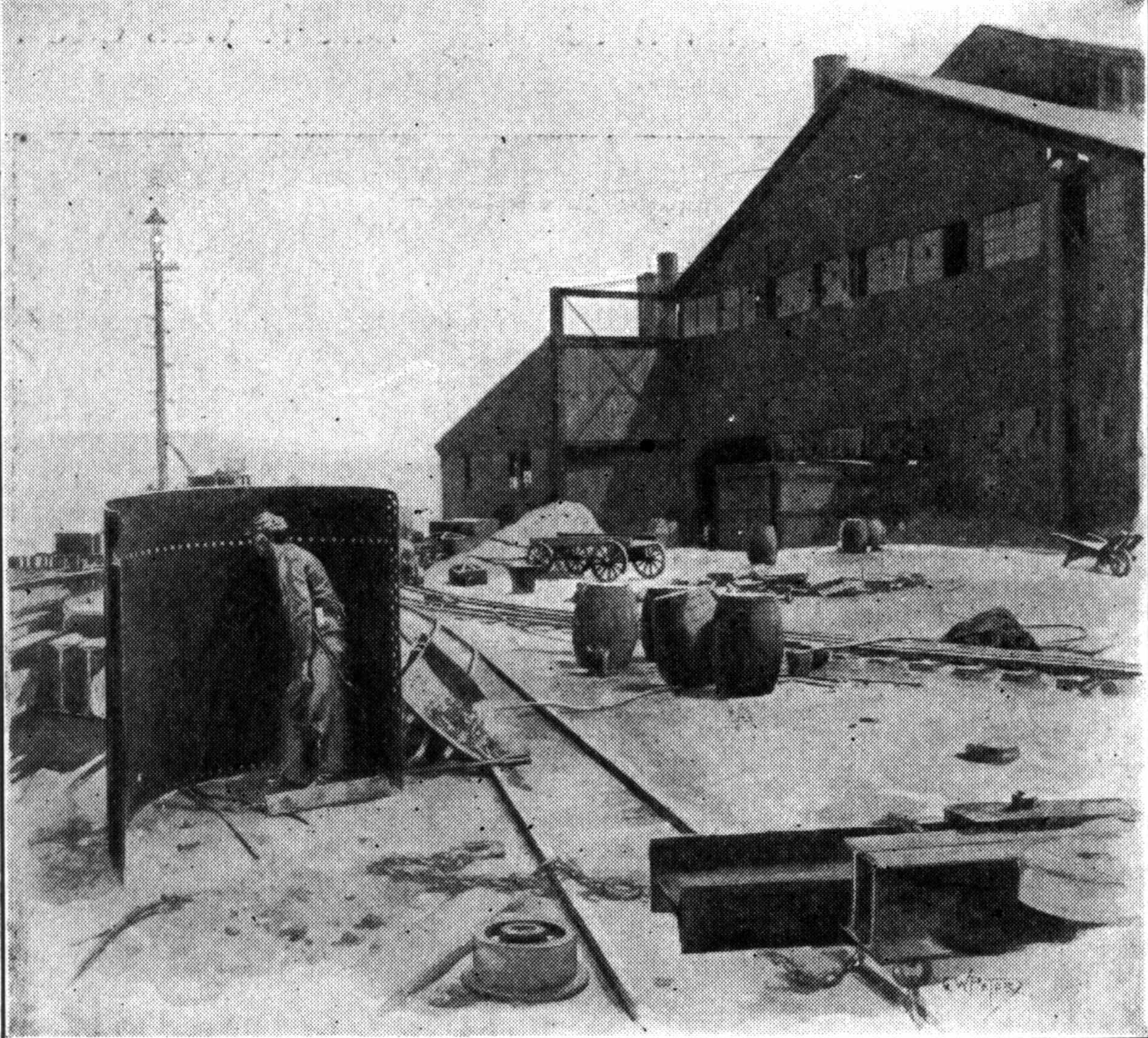
Artist's impression of a striker hiding behind a large shield and watching the Pinkerton men.

The Pinkertons attempted to disembark again at 8:00 a.m. A striker high up the riverbank fired a shot. The Pinkertons returned fire, and four more strikers were killed (one by shrapnel sent flying when cannon fire hit one of the barges). Many of the Pinkerton agents refused to participate in the firefight any longer; the agents crowded onto the barge farthest from the shore. More experienced agents were barely able to stop the new recruits from abandoning the ships and swimming away. Intermittent gunfire from both sides continued throughout the morning. When the tug attempted to retrieve the barges at 10:50 a.m., gunfire drove it off. More than 300 riflemen positioned themselves on the high ground and kept a steady stream of fire on the barges. Just before noon, a sniper shot and killed another Pinkerton agent. A Pinkerton agent on one of the barges was A.L. Wells, a Bennett Medical College student, who had joined the "expedition" to earn enough money during the summer months. During the fighting, he played a vital role and attended to the injured on the barge.

After a few more hours, the strikers attempted to burn the barges. They seized a raft, loaded it with oil-soaked timber and floated it toward the barges. The Pinkertons nearly panicked, and a Pinkerton captain had to threaten to shoot anyone who fled. But the fire burned itself out before it reached the barges. The strikers then loaded a railroad flatcar with drums of oil and set it afire. The flatcar hurtled down the rails toward the mill's wharf where the barges were docked. But the car stopped at the water's edge and burned itself out. Dynamite was thrown at the barges, but it only hit the mark once (causing a little damage to one barge). At 2:00 p.m., the workers poured oil onto the river, hoping the oil slick would burn the barges; attempts to light the slick failed.

=== Calls for state intervention ===
The AA worked behind the scenes to avoid further bloodshed and defuse the tense situation. At 9:00 a.m., outgoing AA international president William Weihe rushed to the sheriff's office and asked McCleary to convey a request to Frick to meet. McCleary did so, but Frick refused. He knew that the more chaotic the situation became, the more likely it was that Governor Robert E. Pattison would call out the state militia.

Sheriff McCleary resisted attempts to call for state intervention until 10 a.m. on July 6. In a telegram to Governor Pattison, he described how his deputies and the Carnegie men had been driven off, and noted that the workers and their supporters actively resisting the landing numbered nearly 5,000. Pattison responded by requiring McCleary to exhaust every effort to restore the peace. McCleary asked again for help at noon, and Pattison responded by asking how many deputies the sheriff had. A third telegram, sent at 3:00 p.m., again elicited a response from the governor exhorting McCleary to raise his own troops.

=== Pinkerton surrender ===
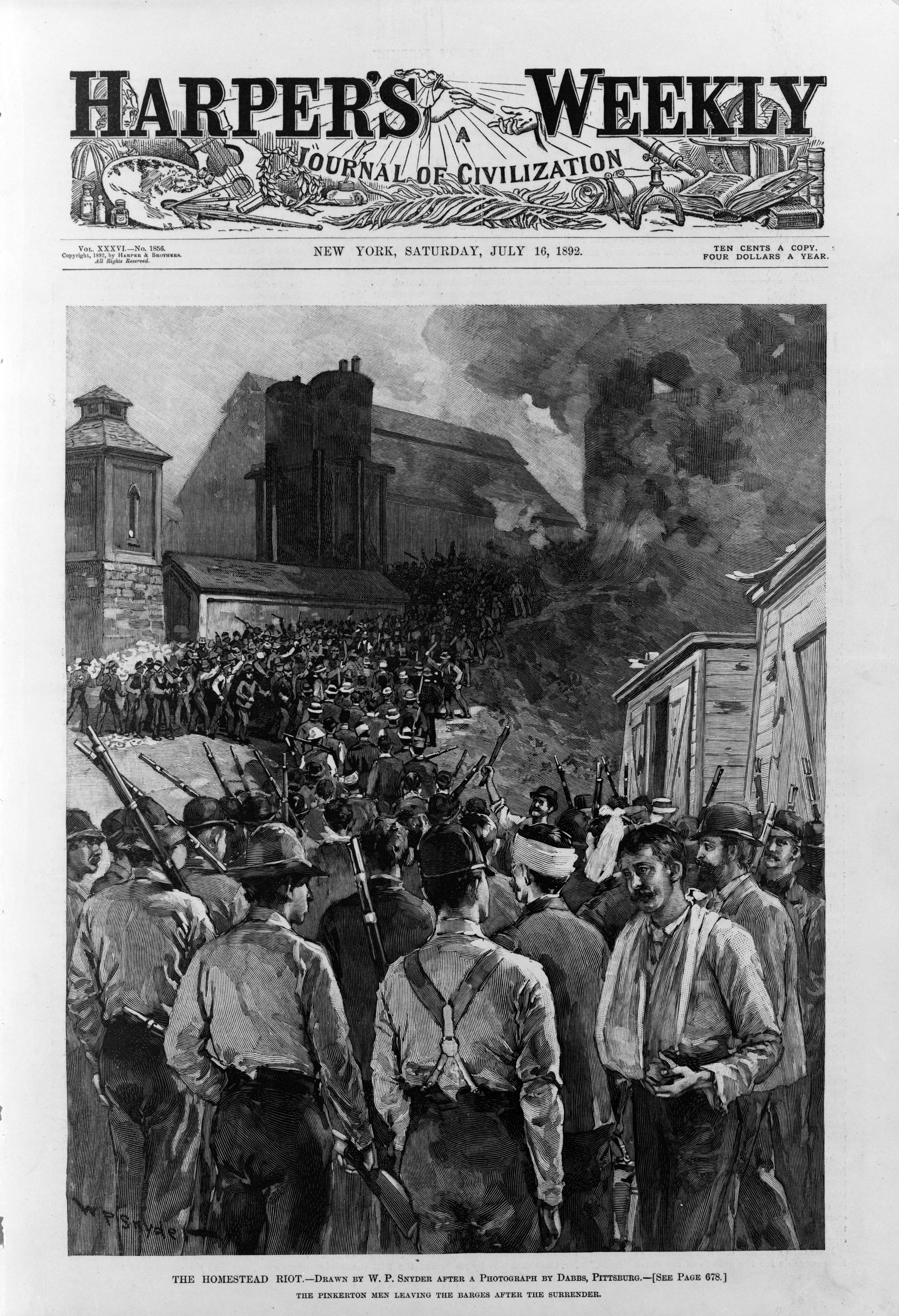
Pinkerton men leave the barges after their surrender during the Homestead strike

At 4:00 p.m., events at the mill quickly began to wind down. More than 5,000 men—most of them armed mill hands from the nearby South Side, Braddock and Duquesne works—arrived at the Homestead plant. Weihe wanted to prevent further trouble at Homestead, so he pleaded with Frick to confer with representatives of the Amalgamated to return to Homestead and stop the armed conflict. Weihe urged the strikers to let the Pinkertons surrender, but he was shouted down. Weihe tried to speak again, but this time his pleas were drowned out as the strikers bombarded the barges with fireworks left over from the recent Independence Day celebration. Hugh O'Donnell, a heater in the plant and head of the union's strike committee, then spoke to the crowd. He demanded that each Pinkerton be charged with murder, forced to turn over his arms and then be removed from the town. The crowd shouted their approval.

The Pinkertons also wished to surrender. At 5:00 p.m., they raised a white flag and two agents asked to speak with the strikers. O'Donnell guaranteed them safe passage out of town. Upon arrival, their arms were stripped from them. With heads uncovered, to distinguish them from the mill hands, they passed along between two rows of guards armed with Winchesters. As the Pinkertons crossed the grounds of the mill, the crowd formed a gantlet through which the agents passed. Men and women threw sand and stones at the Pinkerton agents, spat on them and beat them. Several Pinkertons were clubbed into unconsciousness. Members of the crowd ransacked the barges, then burned them to the waterline.

As the Pinkertons were marched through town to the opera house (which served as a temporary jail), the townspeople continued to assault the agents. The press expressed shock at the treatment of the Pinkerton agents, and the torrent of abuse helped turn media sympathies away from the strikers. The strike committee met with the town council to discuss the handover of the agents to McCleary. But the real talks were taking place between McCleary and Weihe in McCleary's office. At 10:15 p.m., the two sides agreed to a transfer process. A special train arrived at 12:30 a.m. on July 7. McCleary, the international AA's lawyer and several town officials accompanied the Pinkerton agents to Pittsburgh.

But when the Pinkerton agents arrived at their final destination in Pittsburgh, state officials declared that they would not be charged with murder (per the agreement with the strikers) but rather simply released. The announcement was made with the full concurrence of the AA attorney. A special train whisked the Pinkerton agents out of the city at 10:00 a.m. on July 7.

William Pinkerton in his testimony before Congress stated that three Pinkerton agents died in the strike—two because of injuries and a third injured agent committed suicide. The total number of Pinkertons, according to the agents themselves, who died was seven and who were wounded was eleven. According to one newspaper report, an agent under cannon fire jumped off a barge and drowned. John Shingle, the captain of the steamboat Little Bill was killed. Between thirty-three to thirty-five agents and one crewman of the Little Bill were reported in the hospital injured. The total number of captured Pinkertons was 324. A roster of 266 names and 360 Winchester rifles and enough provisions to feed a regiment for a week were also taken from the barges.

== Arrival of the state militia ==
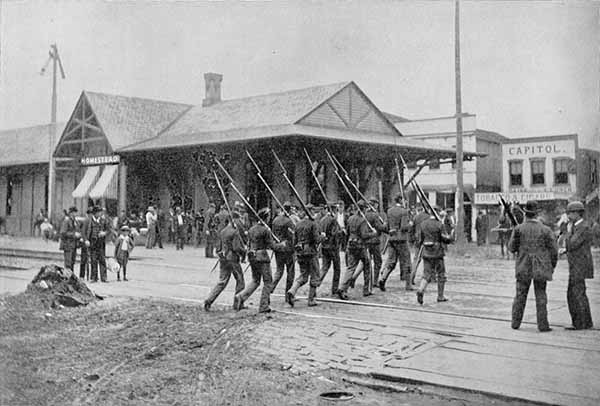
State militia passing the railroad station to disperse groups of strikers.

On July 7, the strike committee sent a telegram to Governor Pattison to attempt to persuade him that law and order had been restored in the town. Pattison replied that he had heard differently. Union officials traveled to Harrisburg and met with Pattison on July 9. Their discussions revolved not around law and order, but the safety of the Carnegie plant.

Pattison, however, remained unconvinced by the strikers' arguments. Although Pattison had ordered the Pennsylvania militia to muster on July 6, he had not formally charged it with doing anything. Pattison's refusal to act rested largely on his concern that the union controlled the entire city of Homestead and commanded the allegiance of its citizens. Pattison refused to order the town taken by force, for fear a massacre would occur. But once emotions had died down, Pattison felt the need to act. He had been elected with the backing of a Carnegie-supported political machine, and he could no longer refuse to protect Carnegie interests.

The steelworkers resolved to meet the militia with open arms, hoping to establish good relations with the troops. But the militia managed to keep its arrival to the town a secret almost to the last moment. At 9:00 a.m. on July 12, the Pennsylvania state militia arrived at the small Munhall train station near the Homestead mill (rather than the downtown train station as expected). Their commander, Major General George R. Snowden, made it clear to local officials that he sided with the owners. When Hugh O'Donnell, the head of the union's strike committee attempted to welcome Snowden and pledge the cooperation of the strikers, Snowden told him that the strikers had not been law abiding, and that "I want you to distinctly understand that I am the master of this situation." More than 4,000 soldiers surrounded the plant. Within 20 minutes they had displaced the picketers; by 10:00 a.m., company officials were back in their offices. Another 2,000 troops camped on the high ground overlooking the city.

The company quickly brought in strikebreakers and restarted production under the protection of the militia. Despite the presence of AFL pickets in front of several recruitment offices across the nation, Frick easily found employees to work the mill. The company quickly built bunk houses, dining halls and kitchens on the mill grounds to accommodate the strikebreakers. New employees, many of them black, arrived on July 13, and the mill furnaces relit on July 15. When a few workers attempted to storm into the plant to stop the relighting of the furnaces, militiamen fought them off and wounded six with bayonets. But all was not well inside the plant. A race war between nonunion black and white workers in the Homestead plant broke out on July 22, 1892.

Desperate to find a way to continue the strike, the AA appealed to Whitelaw Reid, the Republican candidate for vice president, on July 16. The AA offered to make no demands or set any preconditions; the union merely asked that Carnegie Steel reopen the negotiations. Reid wrote to Frick, warning him that the strike was hurting the Republican ticket and pleading with him to reopen talks. Frick refused.

== Attempted assassination and collapse of the strike ==
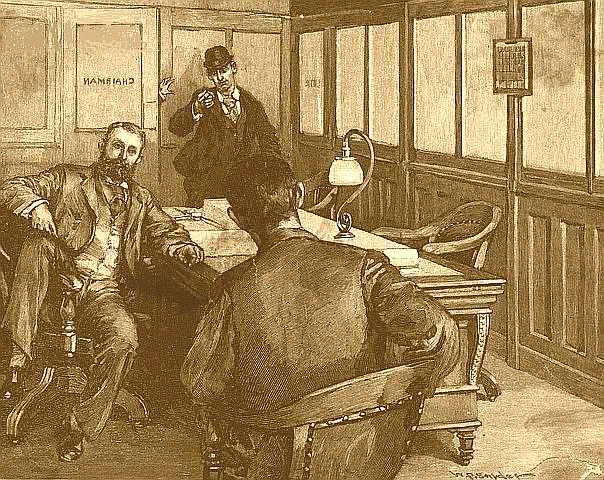
Berkman's attempt to assassinate Frick, as illustrated by W. P. Snyder for Harper's Weekly in 1892

Frick, too, needed a way out of the strike. The company could not operate for long with strikebreakers living on the mill grounds, and permanent replacements had to be found. On July 18, the town was placed under martial law, further disheartening many of the strikers.

National attention became riveted on Homestead when, on July 23, Alexander Berkman, a New York anarchist with no connection to steel or to organized labor, plotted with his lover Emma Goldman to assassinate Frick. He came in from New York, gained entrance to Frick's office, then shot and stabbed the executive. Frick survived and continued his role; Berkman was sentenced to 22 years in prison.

The Berkman assassination attempt undermined public support for the union and prompted the final collapse of the strike. Hugh O'Donnell was removed as chair of the strike committee when he proposed to return to work at the lower wage scale if the unionists could get their jobs back. On August 12, the company announced that 1,700 men were working at the mill and production had resumed at full capacity. The national AFL refused to intervene, the East European workers ignored the union and it had no strategy left. The union voted to go back to work on Carnegie's terms; the strike had failed and the union had collapsed.

=== Legal battles ===
The company had waged a second front in state court, and was winning. On July 18, sixteen of the strike leaders were charged with conspiracy, riot and murder. Each man was jailed for one night and forced to post a $10,000 bond. The union retaliated by charging company executives with murder as well. The company men, too, had to post a $10,000 bond, but they were not forced to spend any time in jail. One judge issued treason charges against the Advisory Committee on August 30 for making itself the law. Most of the men could not raise the bail bond, and went to jail or into hiding. A compromise was reached whereby both sides dropped their charges.

== The strike's conclusion ==
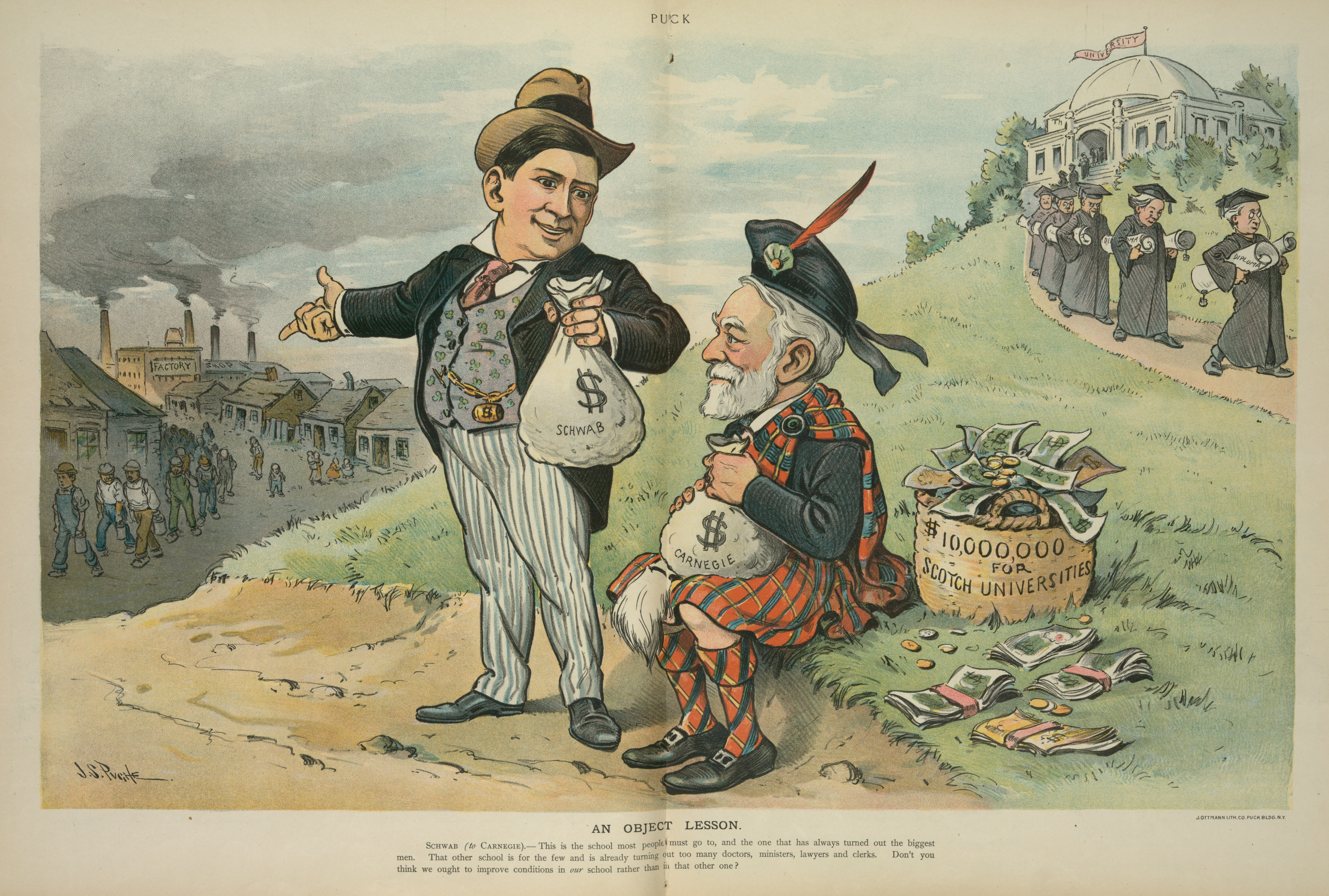
Puck illustration in which Schwab asks Carnegie whether it might be wiser to use the wealth from industry to benefit the worker rather than donate it to institutions for the privileged few.

Support for the strikers evaporated. The AFL refused to call for a boycott of Carnegie products in September 1892. Wholesale crossing of the picket line occurred, first among Eastern European immigrants and then among all workers. The strike had collapsed so much that the state militia pulled out on October 13, ending the 95-day occupation. The AA was nearly bankrupted by the job action. Weekly union relief for a member averaged $6.25 but totaled a staggering $10,000 per week when including 1,600 strikers. With only 192 out of more than 3,800 strikers in attendance, the Homestead chapter of the AA voted, 101 to 91, to return to work on November 20, 1892.

In the end, only four workers were ever tried on the actual charges filed on July 18. Three AA members were found innocent of all charges. Hugh Dempsey, the leader of the local Knights of Labor District Assembly, was found guilty of conspiring to poison nonunion workers at the plant—despite the state's star witness recanting his testimony on the stand. Dempsey served a seven-year prison term. In February 1893, Knox and the union agreed to drop the charges filed against one another, and no further prosecutions emerged from the events at Homestead.

The striking AA affiliate in Beaver Falls gave in the same day as the Homestead lodge. The AA affiliate at Union Mills held out until August 14, 1893. But by then the union had only 53 members. The union had been broken; the company had been operating the plant at full capacity for almost a year, since September 1892.

== Aftermath ==
The Homestead strike broke the AA as a force in the American labor movement. Many employers refused to sign contracts with their AA unions while the strike lasted. A nationwide 1893 Depression saw prices for steel plunge; other steel companies sought wage decreases similar to those imposed at Homestead.

An organizing drive at the Homestead plant in 1896 was suppressed by Frick. The economy recovered by 1897. In May 1899, three hundred Homestead workers formed an AA lodge, but Frick ordered the Homestead works shut down and the unionization effort collapsed.

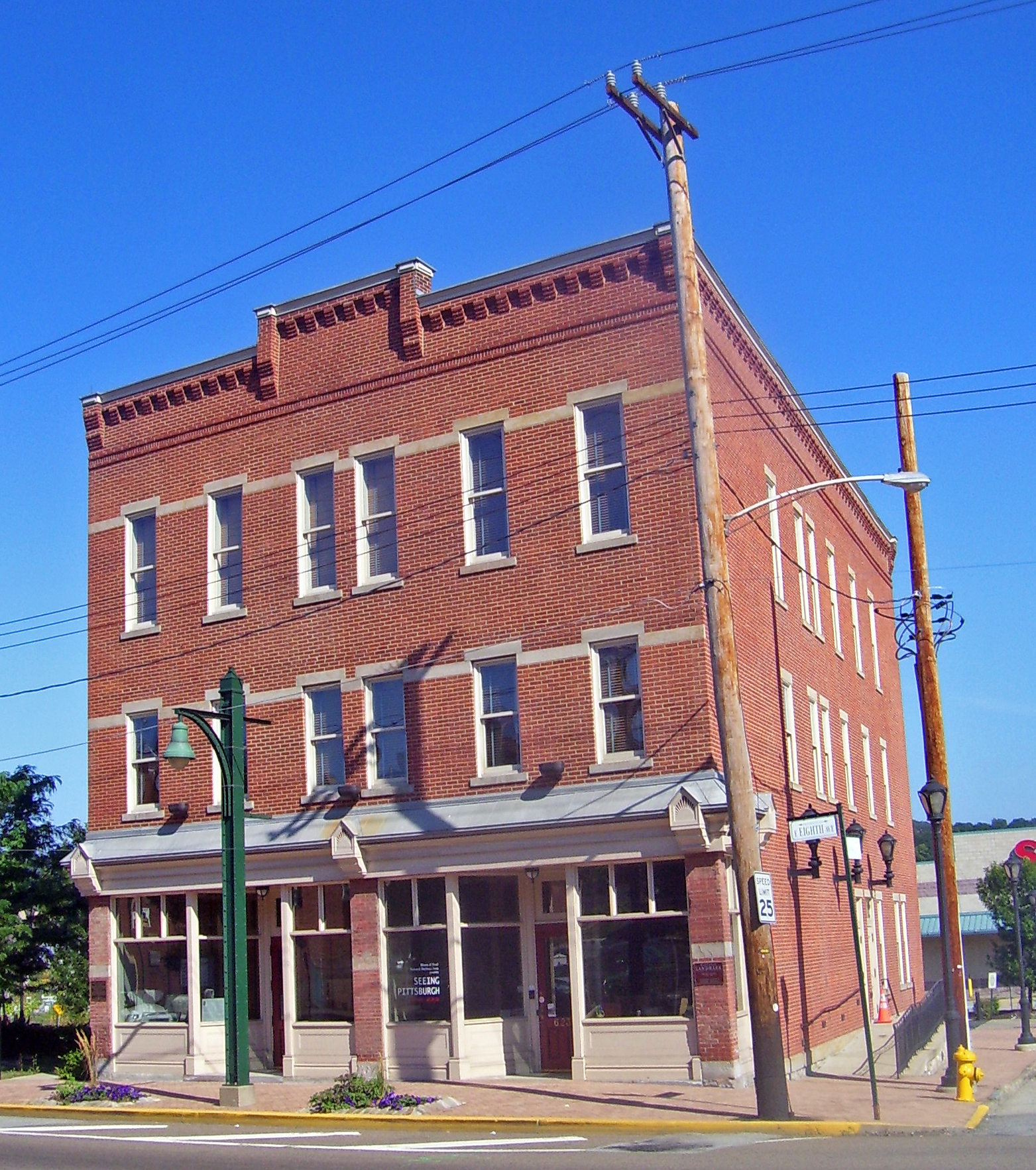
The Bost Building, AA headquarters during the strike and today a National Historic Landmark

De-unionization efforts throughout the Midwest began against the AA in 1897 when Jones and Laughlin Steel refused to sign a contract. By 1900, not a single steel plant in Pennsylvania remained unionized. The AA presence in Ohio and Illinois continued for a few more years, but the union continued to collapse. Many lodges disbanded, their members disillusioned. Others were easily broken in short battles. Carnegie Steel's Mingo Junction, Ohio, plant was the last major unionized steel mill in the country. But it, too, successfully withdrew recognition without a fight in 1903.

AA membership sagged to 10,000 in 1894 from its high of over 24,000 in 1891. A year later, it was down to 8,000. A 1901 strike against Carnegie's successor company, U.S. Steel, collapsed. By 1909, membership in the AA had sunk to 6,300. A nationwide steel strike of 1919 also was unsuccessful. The AA maintained a rump membership in the steel industry until its takeover by the Steel Workers Organizing Committee in 1936. The two organizations officially disbanded and formed the United Steelworkers on May 22, 1942.

In 1999 the Bost Building in downtown Homestead, AA headquarters throughout the strike, was designated a National Historic Landmark. It is used as a museum devoted not only to the strike, but also the steel industry in the Pittsburgh area. A railroad bridge over the Monongahela River near the site of the battle is named Pinkerton's Landing Bridge in honor of the dead. Two sites were each designated with a Pennsylvania state historical marker: the site where Pinkerton attempted to land, and the two adjoining cemeteries of St. Mary's and Homestead where are buried the remains of six of the seven Carnegie Steel Company workers that were killed. The Pinkerton landing site was also named a Pittsburgh History and Landmarks Foundation Historic Landmark.

== Modern site ==
The pump house where the gunfight occurred remains as a museum and meeting hall. There are several historical markers as well as a metal commemorative sign with the US Steel logo that reads "In honor of the workers".

== See also ==
- Battle of Blair Mountain
- Battle of Matewan
- 1892 Buffalo switchmen's strike
- Frick Coke Company strike of 1891
- Frick mine explosion
- Pittsburgh railroad strike
- Pullman Strike
- Ludlow Massacre
- Johnstown Flood of 1889
- List of worker deaths in United States labor disputes

== General and cited references ==
- Bemis, Edward W. "The Homestead Strike". The Journal of Political Economy. Vol. 2, No. 3 (June 1894), pp. 369–396. JSTOR 1819234.
- Brody, David. Steelworkers in America: The Nonunion Era. New York: Harper Torchbooks, 1969.
- Cohen, Steven R. "Steelworkers Rethink the Homestead Strike of 1892," Pennsylvania History, 48 (April 1981), 155–177
- David P. Demarest, Jr. (ed.), "The River Ran Red": Homestead, 1892. Pittsburgh: University of Pittsburgh Press, 1992.
- Foner, Philip. History of the Labor Movement in the United States. Vol. 2: From the Founding of the A.F. of L. to the Emergence of American Imperialism. New York: International Publishers, 1955.
- House Judiciary Committee, Investigation of the Employment of Pinkerton Detectives in Connection with the Labor Troubles at Homestead, PA. Washington, D.C.: US Government Printing Office, 1892.
- Kahan, Paul. The Homestead Strike: Labor, Violence, and American Industry. Routledge, 2014.
- Krass, Peter. Carnegie. (2002). online
- Krause, Paul. The Battle for Homestead, 1890–1892: Politics, Culture, and Steel. Pittsburgh, PA: University of Pittsburgh Press, 1992.
- Krause, Paul. "Labor Republicanism and 'Za Clebom': Anglo-American and Slavic Solidarity in Homestead," in "Struggle a Hard Battle": Essays on Working-Class Immigrants, edited by Dirk Hoerder (1986), 143–169
- Marcus, Irwin. Jeanne Bullard, and Rob Moore, "Change and Continuity: Steel Workers in Homestead, Pennsylvania, 1880–1895," Pennsylvania Magazine of History and Biography, 111 (January 1987), 62–75
- Miner, Curtis. Homestead: The Story of a Steel Town (Pittsburgh 1989)
- Montgomery, David. The Fall of the House of Labor: The Workplace, the State, and American Labor Activism, 1865–1925. New York: Cambridge University Press, 1987.
- Oates, William C., George Ticknor Curtis, and Terence V. Powderly, "The Homestead Strike", North American Review, vol. 155, whole no. 430 (Sept. 1892), pp. 355–375.
- Slavishak, Edward S., "Working-Class Muscle: Homestead and Bodily Disorder in the Gilded Age", The Journal of the Gilded Age and Progressive Era 3 (October 2004): 339–368.
- Warren, Kenenth. Triumphant Capitalism: Henry Clay Frick and the Industrial Transformation of America (2000)
- Wolff, Leon "Battle at Homestead" American Heritage Magazine April 1965
- Wright, Carroll D. "The Amalgamated Association of Iron and Steelworkers," Quarterly Journal of Economics, 7 (July 1893), 400–432. JSTOR 1882283.
