= Morozovka =

Morozovka Морозовка
- Selo
- Location within Amur Oblast Location within Russia
- Coordinates: 50°35′N 129°17′E
- Country: Russia
- Region: Amur Oblast
- District: Romnensky District
- Time zone: UTC+9:00

Morozovka (Russian: Морозовка) is a rural locality (a selo) in Svyatorussovsky Selsoviet of Romnensky District, Amur Oblast, Russia. The population was 72 as of 2018. There are 2 streets.

== Geography ==
Morozovka is located 20 km south of Romny (the district's administrative centre) by road. Lyubimoye is the nearest rural locality.
