= Reading Railroad Massacre =

Strikes and riots in Reading, Pennsylvania in 1877

- Part of the Great Railroad Strike of 1877
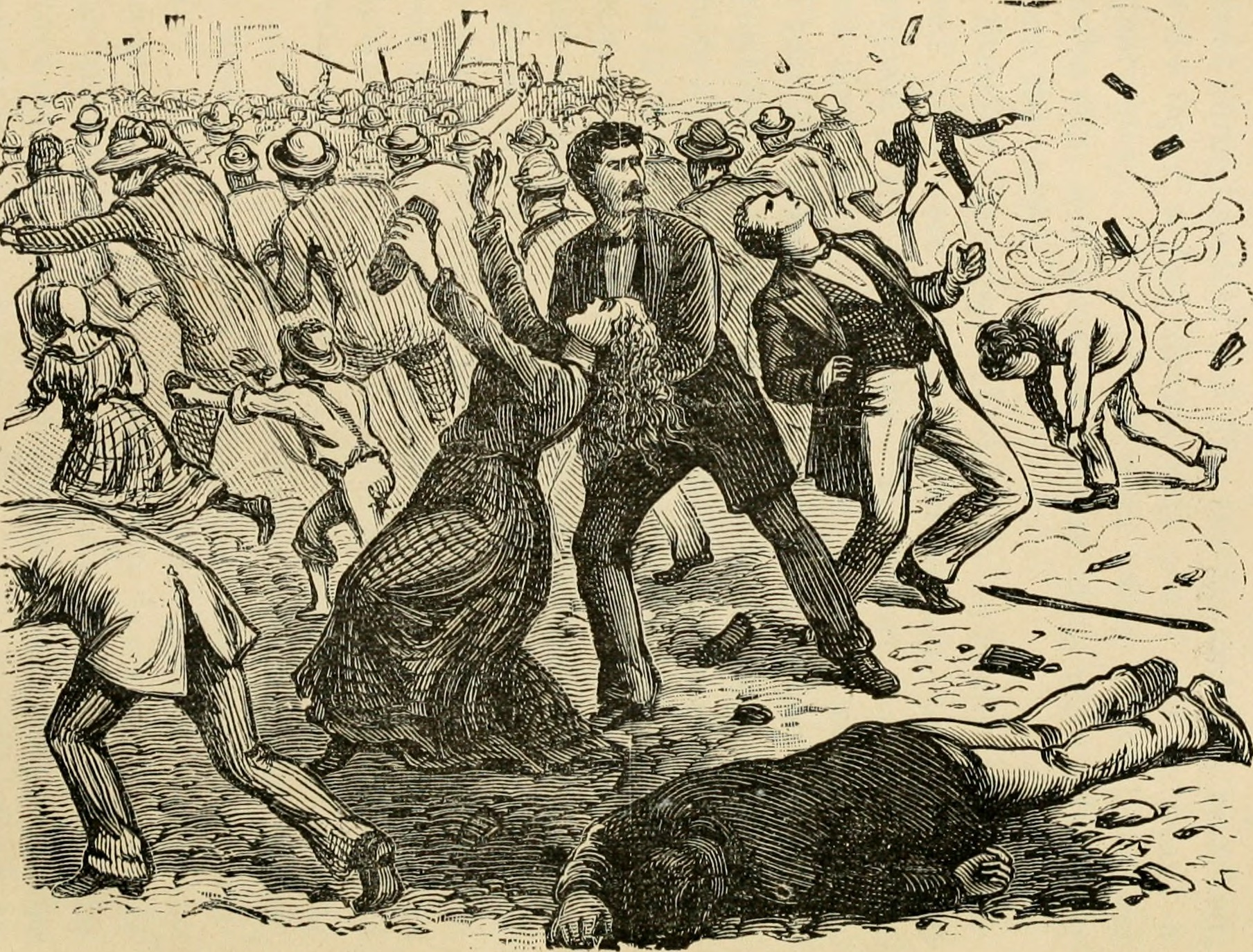
- A contemporary illustration of "The Scene After the First Volley"
- Date: July 23, 1877
- Location: Reading, Pennsylvania
- Result: Peace restored after two days, Lebanon Valley Branch bridge burned, seven convicted of the bridge burning, three others convicted, five companies of the 16th Regiment disbanded for cowardice and insubordination

Casualties and losses
Civilians; Deaths: 10–16; Injuries: 37–50; Arrests: 100	Military; Deaths: 0 Injuries: 20-203 total 2–31 badly

The Reading Railroad Massacre occurred on July 23, 1877, when strikes in Reading, Pennsylvania, led to an outbreak of violence, during which 10 to 16 people were killed and between 20 and 203 were injured. It was the climax of local events during the Great Railroad Strike of 1877 towards the end of the Long Depression of 1873–1879, following arson and riots against local facilities of the Philadelphia and Reading Railway.

Units of the Pennsylvania State Militia were brought in by train. Near nightfall, one unit was marched into the Seventh Street Cut, a man-made ravine three blocks long with 20-or-30-foot (6.1 or 9.1 m) walls, to free a train that had been stopped by rioters. The soldiers were bombarded from above with bricks, stones, and gunshots, and some of the soldiers fired rifle volleys into a crowd at the far end of the Cut. Between 10 and 16 civilian deaths resulted, along with dozens of injuries. Most rioting ended that night, and tense quiet prevailed the next day. Ultimately, the arrival of federal troops restored order to Reading. A coroner's inquest following the massacre did not blame the militia for the deaths, but pointed to the overall upheaval in the city at the time. Blame was laid upon the local sheriff for failing to keep the public order.

== Long Depression and Great Strikes ==
Growth rates of industrial production (1850s–1913)
	1850s–1873	1873–1890	1890–1913
Germany	4.3	2.9	4.1
United Kingdom	3.0	1.7	2.0
United States	6.2	4.7	5.3
France	1.7	1.3	2.5
Italy		0.9	3.0
Sweden		3.1	3.5

The Long Depression, sparked in the United States by the Panic of 1873, had extensive implications for US industry, closing more than a hundred railroads in the first year and cutting construction of new rail lines from 7,500 miles (12,100 km) of track in 1872 to 1,600 miles (2,600 km) in 1875. Approximately 18,000 businesses failed between 1873 and 1875, production in iron and steel dropped as much as 45 percent, and a million or more lost their jobs. In 1876, 76 railroad companies went bankrupt or entered receivership in the US alone, and the economic impacts rippled through many economic sectors throughout the industrialized world.

In mid-1877, tensions erupted in stoppages and civil unrest across the nation in what became known as the Great Railroad Strike or the Great Strikes. Violence broke out in Martinsburg, West Virginia, and spread along the rail lines through Baltimore and on to several major cities and transportation hubs of the time, including Reading, Scranton, and Shamokin, Pennsylvania; a bloodless general strike in St. Louis, Missouri; and a short lived uprising in Chicago, Illinois. In the worst case, rioting in Pittsburgh, Pennsylvania, left 61 dead and 124 injured. Much of the city's center was burned, including more than a thousand rail cars destroyed. What began as the peaceful actions of organized labor attracted the masses of discontented and unemployed workers spawned by the depression, along with others who took opportunistic advantage of the chaos. In total, an estimated 100,000 workers participated nationwide.

== Early actions ==
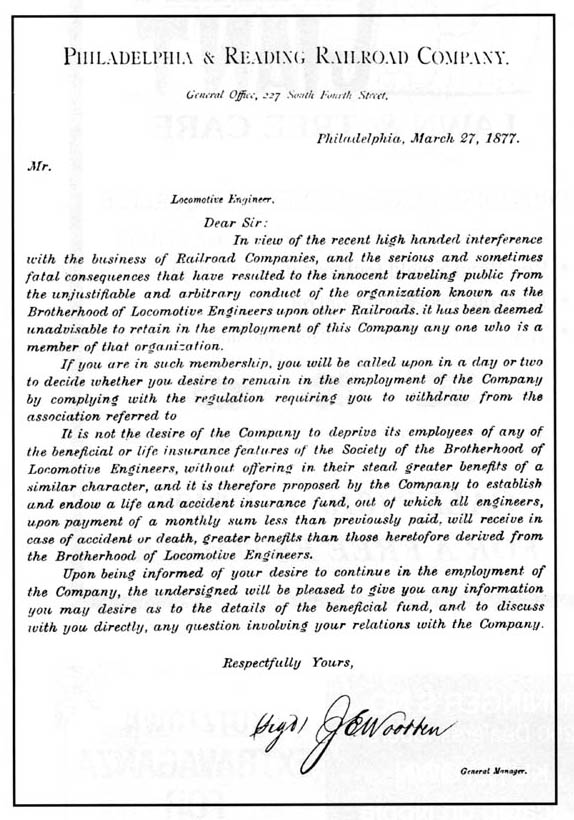
Letter from the railroad to members of the Brotherhood of Locomotive Engineers and Trainmen

In 1877, the city of Reading was largely controlled by the Philadelphia and Reading Railway under Franklin B. Gowen. The town was heavily reliant on rail along with the Philadelphia and Reading Coal and Iron Company. There was a general doubt as to whether conditions existed for serious labor troubles. At one point, the Pottsville Miners Journal wrote in an editorial that "the men have no organization, and there is too much race jealousy existing among them to permit them to form [a strike]".

Reading had seen strikes for a time. In early 1877, members of the Brotherhood of Locomotive Engineers and Trainmen had requested a raise. When the railroad refused, and "the men had no choice but to strike", the railroad effectively crushed the trade union. They issued a letter telling their employees that, of those who were members of the Brotherhood, "It has been deemed unadvisable to retain in the employment of this Company any one who is a member of that organization," issuing an ultimatum that they would either leave the union or lose their jobs. Many citizens of Reading were subsequently fired and blacklisted. Others who were still employed by the company were owed back wages, and had not been paid since the end of strikes in May, but they were eventually paid on July 20. (Note: One source explains the payment only in terms that the company was "perhaps becoming uneasy." The source continues, "Many of the men were hostile to the paymaster, remarking that the money would immediately go to cancel debts incurred during the past two payless months. Ironically, the fact that they had been paid may have actually made the men freer to strike.")

Throughout much of the early strikes elsewhere, there was little unrest in the town. Upon the start of strikes nationwide on July 16, the town remained relatively calm, to the point that the mayor left on a vacation to Ocean Grove, New Jersey.

== July 22–23, 1877 ==
Violence broke out on July 22, 1877, when a car filled with roof shingles was set ablaze on a railroad siding, near the corner of Elm Street and 7th Street. (Note: Around this time, Elm Street extended fully to meet, rather than turning southward immediately prior to the tracks at 7th Street. Compare this map of Reading from 1860.) A crowd of over two thousand people took the depot, and burned "two cabooses, seven freight cars, and the watch house at the Reading and Lehigh Railroad junction at Bushong’s Furnace". (Note: See Reading and Lehigh Railroad) As a result of the ongoing unrest throughout Pennsylvania, the state militia was assembling to travel to the Pennsylvania State Capitol in Harrisburg, under order of the governor. In order to prevent the militia from reaching the capitol, a group of rioters set fire to the Lebanon Valley Branch bridge over the Schuylkill River. The bridge was completely destroyed, with only the brick piers remaining. Rail travel with Harrisburg was blocked, the telegraph lines were damaged, and the debris halted passage both up and down the Schuylkill. The damage was estimated at $150,000 (equivalent to $4,535,000 in 2025). (Note: McCabe and Winslow record the bridge burned on the night of July 22. Dacus records the bridge burned on the night of July 24. More modern local accounts from the Historical Society of Berks County and the Berks History Center also place the bridge burning prior to the arrival of the 4th Regiment and subsequent shooting, and not following it as Dacus seems to do. The official report on the riots presented to the Pennsylvania General Assembly also places the bridge burned on July 22.)

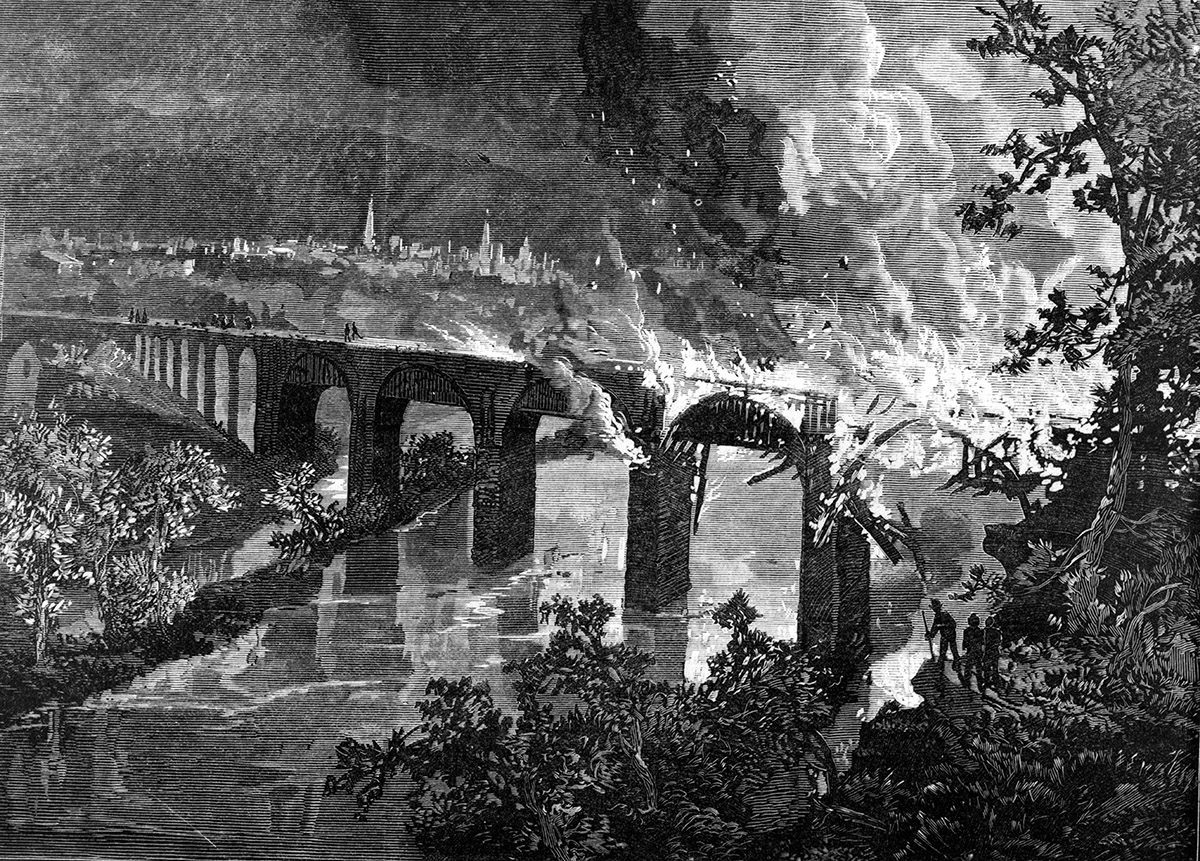
The burning of the Lebanon Valley Branch bridge

At 4:30 pm on July 23, a large crowd that had gathered in Reading began rioting. (Note: The size of the mob was estimated at 2,000 or 3,000.) They seized a passing coal train, put on the brakes, and effectively blocked the rail tracks. An eight-short-ton (7.3 t) coal car was dumped on the tracks. The rioters attempted to stop an express train, and an estimated 200 people ran to the train. They were unsuccessful, and that train along with a number of other trains made their way to the station. The rioters resolved to let no more trains through, and began ripping up and barricading the tracks.

The manager of the Philadelphia and Reading Railroad, John E. Wootten, appealed to the town sheriff to help protect the railroad and its property. He also telegraphed Major General William J. Bolton, commanding the Second Division, Pennsylvania National Guard. Bolton ordered Brigadier General Franklin Reeder and the 4th Pennsylvania Volunteer Militia under his command, to move to Reading from Allentown, Pennsylvania, to the northeast.

The town did little to nothing to stop the rioters. In the newspaper the following day, the Reading Eagle reported the "police force powerless" and that the fire department was "fully equipped and ready for service", but the "large number who were opposed to having water turned on the fire prevented...the department from doing anything."

== Massacre ==
At 6:30 pm on July 23, the Philadelphia and Reading Coal and Iron Police, a private force from the railroad, arrived in the town. At nightfall they were followed by General Reeder and his 4th Regiment. Reeder, expecting to find the depot in possession of the mob, instead found it controlled by the Coal and Iron Police. He found no sheriff or mayor, to whom he was to report, and instead was asked by representatives of the railroad company to assist in relieving a passenger train besieged by the mob near Penn Street, toward which he and his men marched along the railroad tracks.

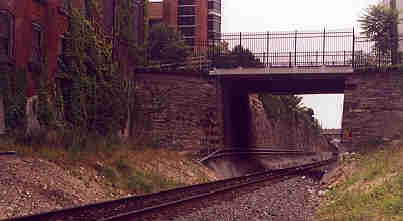
The north entrance to the 7th Street cut, with Walnut Street passing overhead as the stone walls begin on either side

For two blocks north of Penn Street, the tracks descended beneath the streets into a deep cut, flanked on both the right and left by 20-or-30-foot (6.1 or 9.1 m) tall stone walls running through the heart of the city. As the 350 men of the 4th marched in the dark through the cut to the quiet tapping of drums, they were pelted by a large number of stones from the crowd overlooking them. (Note: The New York Times reported five cartloads of stones which were collected from the scene after the shooting. Later, in his report to the State Adjutant General, Reeder recalled, " Upon entering the mouth of the ‘Cut,’ we were met by a volley of stones and some pistol shots. Stones, many of them of enormous size, continued falling, in perfect showers, during the whole of our march.")

Near the intersection with Penn Street, one of the soldiers, without orders, fired at the mob, and then a full volley was released. The mob answered the volley with more stones and pistol shots. The regiment returned fire, (Note: In his official report to the State Adjutant General, Reeder recorded that about two thirds of the way through the cut “a shot was fired by an over excited member of the regiment,” followed by “an irregular dropping fire along the entire column which was kept up until the command emerged from the ‘cut’”. He then records two volleys fired from company F in the front of the column upon reaching the intersection with Penn Street, and that the rear of the formation had been cleared by two volleys from company D.) and left between 10 and 16 dead, and between 37 and 50 injured, including five police officers on duty in the area, one of whom later died. (Note: Dacus records the casualties among the police officers: “Officer Abner Jones, shot through the back, the ball penetrating through his body; officer Ludwig Rupp, shot twice through the right leg; officer Orden Weller, shot in the leg, officer Hart, shot through the thigh; officer Haggerty, shot through the ankle.” Rupp later died from his wounds.) (Note: Lowest estimate for civilian dead comes from McCabe and Winslow at 10. Highest estimate for civilian dead comes from Manweller and Rogers at 16. Lowest estimate for civilian injuries comes from Dacus at 37. High estimate for civilian injuries comes from the report to the Pennsylvania Legislature.)

The streets cleared and businesses closed. Two among the troops were badly hurt, one who had been shot, and another struck with a stone. None were killed, but 31 were injured badly enough to be unfit for duty the following day. The injured among the crowd were taken from the street to nearby drug stores for care. (Note: Contrary to other sources, the official report to the Pennsylvania Legislature lists no serious injuries among the soldiers, but states that only 50 of their number escaped with no injury at all. The same has seven policemen injured, but none killed. This number may come from General Reeders' report to the state Adjutant General, in which he recounts, "Of my command, very few, probably not more than fifty, out of an aggregate strength of two hundred and fifty-three...escaped wholly unhurt. Brecher puts the wounded among the soldier at simply 20, without remark as to who was seriously injured and who was not. Dacus records the badly wounded soldiers as Private Stienberger, Allen Rifles, shot in the left side of his neck, and Private Slatington, Company F, struck in the abdomen by a brick or rock.) Reeder and his men marched first to Penn Square, where he was informed that the mayor was absent, and the sheriff in hiding, and the regiment then marched to and occupied the rail depot.

Three or four alarms were sounded throughout the night, prompting the 4th to assemble as the citizenry (and those attracted to the city by the excitement of the recent disturbances) busied themselves tearing up track, cutting down telegraph poles, and looting freight. A group of six managed to find their way, heavily armed, into the rail depot and were arrested, but despite the continuing vandalism, the remainder of the night passed without further bloodshed.

== Aftermath ==
We are workingmen and we don't fight against workingmen. We want bread at home, but we don't want to rob our fellow-workingmen for it. No sir; we came here to protect property, but not to murder the poor men of Reading.

— Soldier in the 16th Regiment

The soldiers were widely condemned by townspeople, and the public outrage served only to swell the numbers of the mob. In the paper the following morning, the townspeople read of "the most horrible butcheries that has ever disgraced the pages of Reading's local history",

The Eagle has never been called upon to chronicle a more horrible slaughter of its peace and law-abiding citizens as is its duty to-day. ... The pavements, sidewalks and streets in the vicinity of 7th and Penn streets, were literally baptized in blood. ...

On July 24, a group composed of local police, armed citizens, and the Philadelphia and Reading Coal and Iron Police began working to restore calm. A group of police officers seized a stockpile of ammunition that the strikers had hidden, and secured it in the City Hall, which the mob threatened to storm.

=== 16th Regiment ===
Several companies of the 16th Regiment were dispatched from Conshohocken, Pennsylvania, and arrived at 10:00 am on July 24. Many members of the regiment openly supported the rioters. On the morning of the 24th, General Reeder telegraphed to his superior, General Bolton, the predicament of his troops in Reading:

My situation is not improved by the arrival of the Sixteenth regiment, which is very disaffected. The Fourth is becoming anxious, and is also very much exhausted. Should have reliable troops, without delay. ... The Sixteenth regiment is furnishing the strikers with ammunition and openly declare their intention to join the rioters in case of trouble. If troops do not reach us by dark, I cannot vouch for the safety of the city, or my power to hold the depot. Stir heaven and earth to forward reliable and fresh troops.

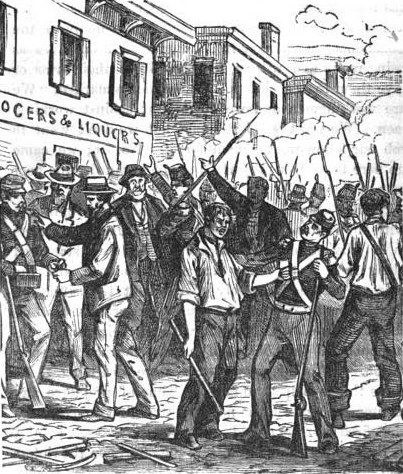
Members of the 16th Regiment surrendering their weapons to the mob

Soldiers began deserting. Some of the 16th drank with the strikers, and drunkenly roamed the streets threatening violence. A great many were won over by the mob in their animosity toward the 4th over the killings of the previous night. As the day progressed, there was a real and growing risk of an open fight between the 16th and the 4th. General Bolton, before leaving for Reading himself, telegraphed the State Adjutant General, "Have United States troops sent to Reading at once. Portion of the Sixteenth regiment are about revolting and joining the strikers". (Note: "United States troops" here refers to soldiers from the federal army, rather than local militia, as the 4th and 16th regiments were. As one source phrases it, "This incident simply reinforced what was becoming obvious to all concerned. Militia was useless in a situation of this kind.")

The night after the shooting, the 4th and the 16th marched beside one another through the cut once more, to protect those repairing the tracks. Crowds had again gathered, and they again pelted the 4th with stones, but now fraternized with the 16th. When some in the 4th raised their rifles without orders, Colonel Schall of the 16th and others of the men shouted that they not shoot. Some of the 16th subsequently threw down their arms, gave over their ammunition to the crowd, or threatened the 4th openly, that if they fired on the crowd, the 16th would fire on them.

To avoid conflict, it was ordered that the 4th and the 16th would be marched out of the city through separate routes, and for a brief while, the security of Reading was entirely in the hands of local authorities. The 4th left for Allentown, the 16th for Philadelphia. As the 16th marched out, the local paper reported they were "loudly cheered when they crossed Penn Street".

And so, upon his arrival in Reading, General Bolton found the depot and much of the surrounding area largely deserted. Fearing more trouble that night, he telegraphed to have the 4th returned and received his reply from Reeder:

The Fourth regiment most positively refuse to return to Reading to-night; the men declare they will walk home rather than return. ... The regiment and company officers are perfectly useless.

=== Federal troops arrive ===
At nightfall, a group of about 300 federal soldiers in the First United States Artillery, with four pieces of artillery, entered the town. Four companies occupied the depot, and a battery of artillery was erected in the southern section of Reading. On the same day, repair work began on the rail tracks. On the morning of July 25, about 1,000 men began work rebuilding the rails, protected by the Coal and Iron police. By 10:00 am, the tracks were fixed and trains were running. An attempt to burn down the depot was made, and for several days the government of the town was uneasy, fearing the resumption of violence.

Hundreds of citizens in the town signed up to be temporary patrolmen. The mayor issued a proclamation that 1,000 new police be sworn in. He and the sheriff "undertook to restore and preserve order, and they accomplished it." The MacLean Post of the Grand Army of the Republic offered its services to the city of Reading. (Note: At the time there were plans to create a regiment composed solely of members of the Grand Army of the Republic.) Within two days peace had been restored. The bridge was replaced by a temporary trestle for about a year, before being rebuilt.

=== Investigation and prosecution ===
Testimony was gathered that implicated some 150 people in the violence, and 100 warrants were issued. Investigations found that many of the rioters who had burned down the bridge, and served as "ringleaders" of the mob had traveled to the town for the express purpose of the riot. A coroners inquest on August 7 found that the massacre was brought upon by the behavior of the rioters themselves, and the only official partially at fault was the sheriff. Of the rioters, seven were sentenced to five years in prison for burning down the Lebanon Valley Branch bridge. Hiram Nachtrieb, a fired engineer, who had been portrayed as the ringleader of the riots was acquitted. "The convicted man received a light sentence." In a later trial, 13 out of 14 charged were acquitted. Of the 63 people indicted for the riots, only three (not including those convicted for burning the bridge) were convicted. (Note: Among the arrested were the street commissioner of Reading,) Companies C, D, E, H, and I of the 16th Regiment were ordered disbanded for cowardice, insubordination, and mutinous conduct.

== Commemoration ==
A historical marker commemorating the massacre was placed on the corner of 7th Street and Penn Street in Reading on October 16, 1993. (Note: Located at 40.335190°N 75.924215°W) The text of the marker reads:

In 1877, amidst hard times, unrest hit U.S. rail lines. Workers for the Philadelphia and Reading Railroad had endured pay cuts. Here, on July 23, militia fired into an unarmed crowd that blocked the trains, and 10 people were killed. U.S. troops reopened the railroad.

== See also ==
- Great Railroad Strike of 1922
- Great Southwest railroad strike of 1886
- List of worker deaths in United States labor disputes
- List of incidents of civil unrest in the United States
- Timeline of labor issues and events
