= 1877 St. Louis general strike =

Pioneering U.S. labor action

- Part of the Great Railroad Strike of 1877
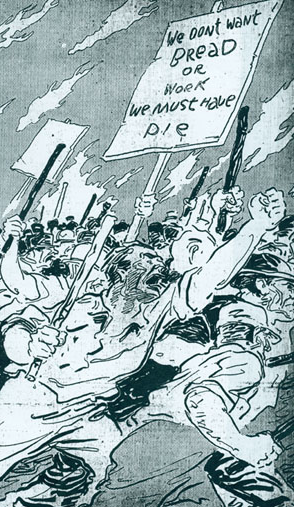
- The St. Louis Republic rendered the strikers as greedy and ruthless.
- Date: July 22–July 28, 1877
- Location: St. Louis
- Goals: Eight-hour day, Ban on child labor
- Methods: General strike, Lockdowns (Rails, Industry)

Casualties and losses
Deaths: 18	

The 1877 St. Louis general strike was one of the first general strikes in the United States. It grew out of the Great Railroad Strike of 1877. The strike was largely organized by the Knights of Labor and the Marxist-leaning Workingmen's Party, the main radical political party of the era.

== The Long Depression and the Great Strikes ==
Growth rates of industrial production (1850s–1913)
	1850s–1873	1873–1890	1890–1913
Germany	4.3	2.9	4.1
United Kingdom	3.0	1.7	2.0
United States	6.2	4.7	5.3
France	1.7	1.3	2.5
Italy		0.9	3.0
Sweden		3.1	3.5

The Long Depression, sparked in the United States by the Panic of 1873, had extensive implications for US industry, closing more than a hundred railroads in the first year and cutting construction of new rail lines from 7,500 miles (12,100 km) of track in 1872 to 1,600 miles (2,600 km) in 1875. Approximately 18,000 businesses failed between 1873 and 1875, production in iron and steel dropped as much as 45 percent, and a million or more lost their jobs. In 1876, 76 railroad companies went bankrupt or entered receivership in the US alone, and the economic impacts rippled throughout many economic sectors throughout the industrialized world.

In mid-1877, tensions erupted in stoppages and civil unrest across the nation in what would become known as the Great Railroad Strike or the Great Strikes. Violence began in Martinsburg, West Virginia and spread along the rail lines through Baltimore and on to several major cities and transportation hubs of the time, including Reading, Scranton and Shamokin, Pennsylvania; a bloodless general strike in St. Louis, Missouri; and a short lived uprising in Chicago, Illinois. In the worst case, rioting in Pittsburgh, Pennsylvania left 61 dead and 124 injured. Much of the city's center was burned, including more than a thousand rail cars destroyed. What began as the peaceful actions of organized labor attracted the masses of discontented and unemployed workers spawned by the depression, along with others who took opportunistic advantage of the chaos. In total, an estimated 100,000 workers participated nationwide.

== July 22–24, 1877 ==
In East St. Louis, Illinois, on July 22, train workers held a secret meeting, resolved to call for an increase in wages, and strike if their demands were not met. Following this initial meeting, a subsequent outdoor meeting was held, with about 200 members of the Workingmen's Party in attendance. The enthusiastic crowd supported various speakers who expressed their sympathy and solidarity with the workers. A third meeting was held that night, in Turner's hall, limited to railroad workers. After several more speeches, they further clarified the demands by adopting a series of resolutions:

Whereas, The United States government has allied itself on the side of capital and against labor; therefore,

Resolved, That we, the workingmen's party of the United States, heartily sympathize with the employes of all the railroads in the country who are attempting to secure just and equitable reward for their labor.

Resolved, That we will stand by them in this most righteous struggle of labor against robbery and oppression, through good and evil report, to the end of the struggle.

— United States Workingmen's Party,

The demand was made and rejected that same night, and so effective at midnight, the strike began in East St. Louis, (Note: Strikers included those working at the Toledo & Wabash Railroad, who had not had their wages reduced, and went on strike in solidarity with other railroad employees.) and within hours strikers virtually controlled the city. The following morning strikers announced they would allow passenger and mail trains passage through the city, but intended to stop all freight traffic. The workers were initially described as "quiet and orderly", and the rail companies initially made no effort to challenge the embargo on freight. When the Chicago & Alton attempted to start one of their freight trains on the morning of the July 23, it was stopped by the strikers and returned to the rail yard. At the Union Railway & Transit Company yards, one stock train was allowed to cross the bridge, while employees of the Transit company struck in East St. Louis, and did not in St. Louis. Even after removing the wage reduction, workers at the Transit company continued to strike. Throughout the day, many other major railroads did not see strikes, and strikes were far less prevalent outside of East St. Louis. Feed was allowed to be brought to livestock, and passenger trains continued to be allowed through. The strike was compared by city officials to the Paris Commune of 1871.

On the morning of July 24, the strikers resolved to stop the movement of passenger trains in addition to freight. An eastbound train with 125 passengers was stopped, and after about an hour of argument, the decision was made to let it through. The next train that entered did not fare equally as well, and was decoupled from its passenger cars. At 11:00 AM, a group of 25 strikers led by an Ohio and Mississippi Railway engineer entered the Union depot, the first time strikers moved outside of East St. Louis. They seized two Missouri Pacific Railroad steam engines, and went to the Missouri Pacific engine shops. The 250 workers at the engine shops continued work and could not be persuaded to leave. The strikers then returned to the Union depot and stopped a train from leaving, allowing it to pass two hours later.

A total of 3,000 to 4,000 people gathered at the depot, and unrest swelled, particularly following the announcement that six companies of infantry were on route to St. Louis. The police cleared and ordered the saloons closed in the region around the depot. At 4:00 PM, flatcars loaded with 400 strikers arrived. They marched to the Missouri Pacific Shops, arriving with about 2,000 people. The machinists announced that while they were not going to strike, they would stop working in solidarity with the strikers. The men then traveled to the North Missouri Railroad track and, taking an engine and ten flat cars, went to the North Missouri's roundhouse and persuaded the workers to join the strike.

As a result of the strike, various federal receivers and then Secretary of the Interior Carl Schurz urged Secretary of War George W. McCrary to intervene. Schurz wrote that "no United States Marshal, unless backed by Federal troops, can restore order or protect men willing to work...the presence of Federal troops will form a rallying point and do much to restore order." John Pope was directed to protect railroads and promote peace. At 6:00 PM six companies (consisting of about 350 soldiers), led by Colonel Jefferson C. Davis arrived from Fort Leavenworth. Davis stated that "I have been ordered here with general instructions to protect the property of the United States, and shall participate in no movement looking to anything else without I have specific orders from army headquarters," and marched his soldiers to an arsenal barracks. Six additional companies were directed to St. Louis from the 16th and 19th Infantry regiments to leave posts in Kansas, Colorado, and the Oklahoma Territory. Three arrived later on July 24, and the rest on July 25, for a total of 42 officers and 410 soldiers. As the soldiers were only directed to protect federal property, the strikers were largely unaffected by the arrival of troops, and gathered at the Union depot, where they would spend the night.

The people of St. Louis were apprehensive about the strike, and many expected some sort of bloodshed. On the night of July 24, Communist leaders held meetings across the city. Threats of burning newspaper buildings were made, and processions of people marched through the streets. The city government was reluctant to act, as they had less than 1,000 arms, and feared they could not effectively deal with the strike. Their 360-man police force, while many were retained in readiness for some sort of outbreak, "remained strangely inert during the upheaval." After urging by Davis, efforts soon began, led by municipal authorities and various prominent citizens, to raise a 5,000 man force.

== July 25–30, 1877 ==
The following morning, action began around 9:00 am as a crowd of 1,500 people gathered in a marketplace. Largely composed of striking wire and other material manufacturers, at 10:00, they marched from the St. Louis City Hall to Turner Hall (where the executive committee of the Workingmen's Party was meeting). Thirty minutes later, approximately 500 strikers marched to the levee, in an effort to get roustabouts to join the strike. Strikers expected all manufacturing to halt by the end of the day. By 10:00 pm, however, the men of the Laclede Gas Company had reached an agreement with their employers, and returned to work.

On the morning of July 26, there was a mass meeting of coopers. They did not resolve and return to work. 2,500 people gathered again at the Union depot, though little occurred. During the morning, one train (of the Toledo, Wabash and Western Railroad) was allowed to pass over the bridge. Though Chicago & Alton employees sent trains, they were eventually stopped. Due to fear of retribution, the Mississippi Pacific offices were closed though the workers were not striking. A delegation of strikers was sent to Cheltenham, where they ordered smelters and clay workers to go on strike. The workers offered to continue work if provided police protection, but the police refused the request. During the strike, the city was virtually unpoliced, and a request to protect private property made by the employers of the Union Street Railway was also refused. Beef canners soon joined the strike. The Mayor of St. Louis, Henry Overstolz, issued a proclamation warning strikers to not destroy public property. He also announced the formation of a Committee of Safety led by General Andrew J. Smith, Thomas T. Gantt and General John S. Marmaduke.

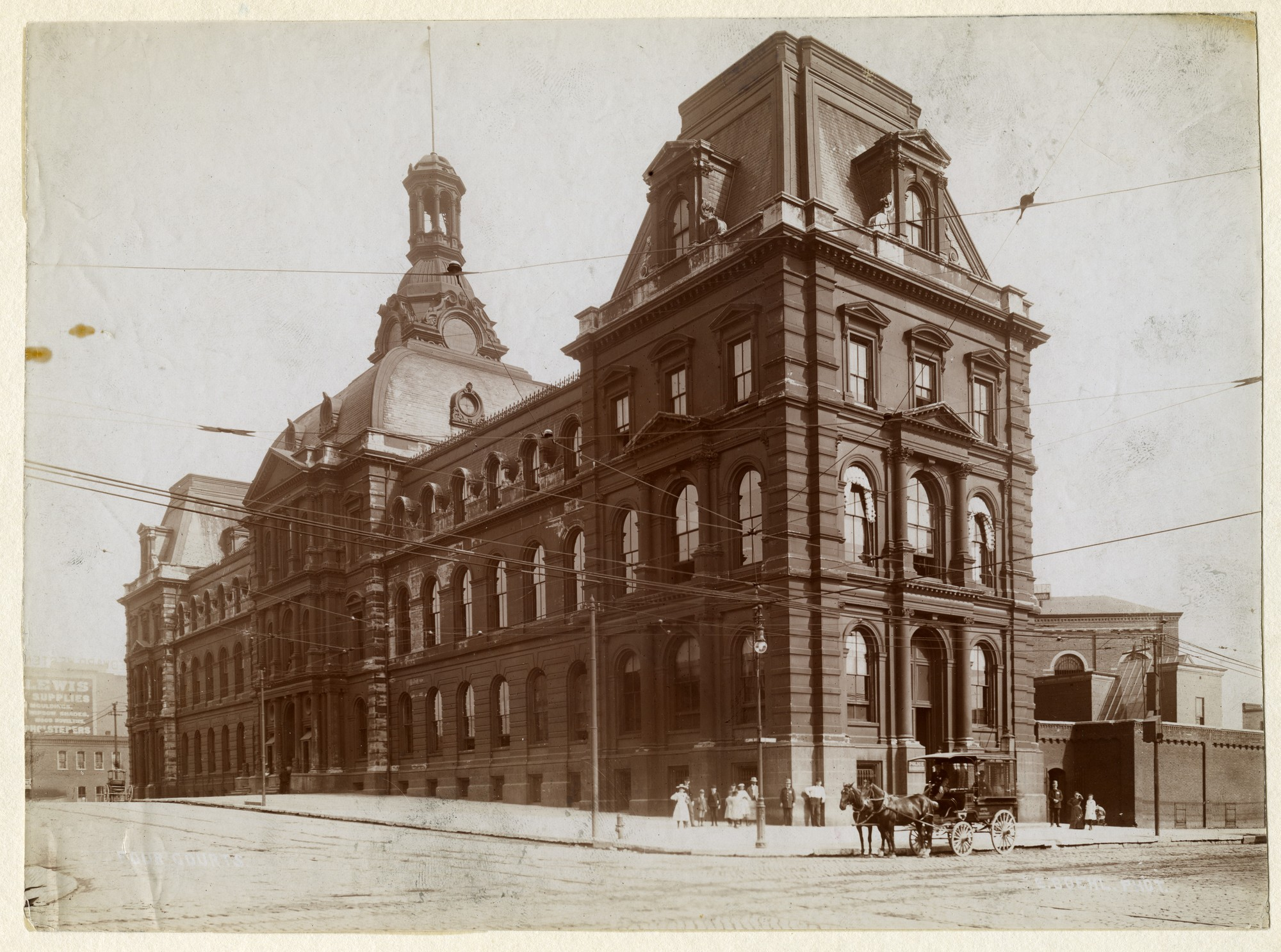
The Four Courts building

Smith also led a 'Citizens Organization for the Protection of Property', headquartered at the Four Courts building. After various meetings throughout the day, the organization had membership numbering around 1,500 armed men. 50 men were placed on the city's steamer to patrol the rivers. By noon of July 26, 10,000 citizens had joined the organization. At 10:00 am, 2,000 men (composed of strikers and loafers) had marched from Lucas market place to a manufacturing district, where they dismantled Belcher's Sugar Refinery to prevent its 400 workers from returning to work. The mob continued (despite many people leaving) to dismantle a further 40 factories, flour mills or planing mills, and forcing an additional 1,000 employees to stop working.

The rioters visited a disused chair factory under the presumption it was active. A squad of police appeared and ordered the strikers out of the factory. Several minutes after leaving, the factory was discovered to be on fire, in what was thought to be a case of arson. The factory and a nearby lumber yard were completely destroyed. The mob was quickly dispersed. Another group traveled to the levees, and forced all steamers to increase the wages of steamboat and levee workers from sixty to one-hundred percent. Throughout the day, most shops in the city were closed, and a further group of 2,000 armed men were raised by the sheriff. The Governor of Missouri, John S. Phelps, arrived, and began helping to suppress disorder. Drilling of the citizens was carried out at the Four Courts building throughout the day.

At around 10:30, a large crowd appeared at the Four Courts building, and began harassing guards patrolling the buildings perimeter. A detachment of police drove the men back and arrested many of the mob. The rioters were made calmer by the information that Davis had increased his troops to 600 men, and stood ready to respond to a call for help from the governor or mayor.

On the morning of the 27th, city authorities began an attempt to stop the mobs. The Union depot was still held by strikers, and at 11:00 am, a battalion of 400 men was dispatched to retake the depot. They caught the strikers by surprise, and ended interference with trains. A mob soon began to gather, and by 2:00 pm, over 2,000 men had gathered. After ignoring calls issued by the mayor urging the group to disperse, 50 mounted police, 500 members of the Citizens Guard and two National Guard companies were sent to break up the mob and arrest its leaders. At 2:30, the force left Four Courts, led by John D. Stevenson and accompanied by Overstolz. At 3:00, the 'executive committee' leading the strike was warned about the force, and fled. The police charged the crowd (by then 3,000 people), and in five minutes the mob was successfully broken up. Seventy men were arrested from the top floor of Schuler Hall. Protection was also offered to various shops that desired to begin operating.

On the night of the 27th, the Workingmen's Party planned three meetings, two of which did not occur; the third was broken up by the police before it started. By July 28, 3,000 vigilantes had been raised. The force, coupled with periodic displays of army soldiers, helped to subdue the strikers. The following days passed with little disturbance and many of the leaders of the strike were arrested. By Monday the 30th, the strike was over in St. Louis.

Many of the strikers had regrouped in East St. Louis after being broken up on the 27th. They resolved to further prevent any trains from passing; however, a United States Marshal requested and received a force of troops to protect the Ohio and Mississippi Railway and St. Louis & Southeastern Railway. The strikers were demoralized, and with the ending of the Chicago railroad strike of 1877, Illinois Governor Shelby Moore Cullom directed seven companies of Illinois National Guard troops to St. Louis. By August 1, the strike had ended in East St. Louis. Fears of another strike, and occasional calls for such an action, reverberated throughout the country for the rest of the summer of 1877.

== See also ==
- Great Railroad Strike of 1922
- St. Louis streetcar strike of 1900
- Great Southwest railroad strike of 1886
- List of worker deaths in United States labor disputes
- List of incidents of civil unrest in the United States
- Timeline of labor issues and events
