= Pittsburgh railroad strike of 1877 =

Strike in Pittsburgh, Pennsylvania, US

- Part of Great Railroad Strike of 1877
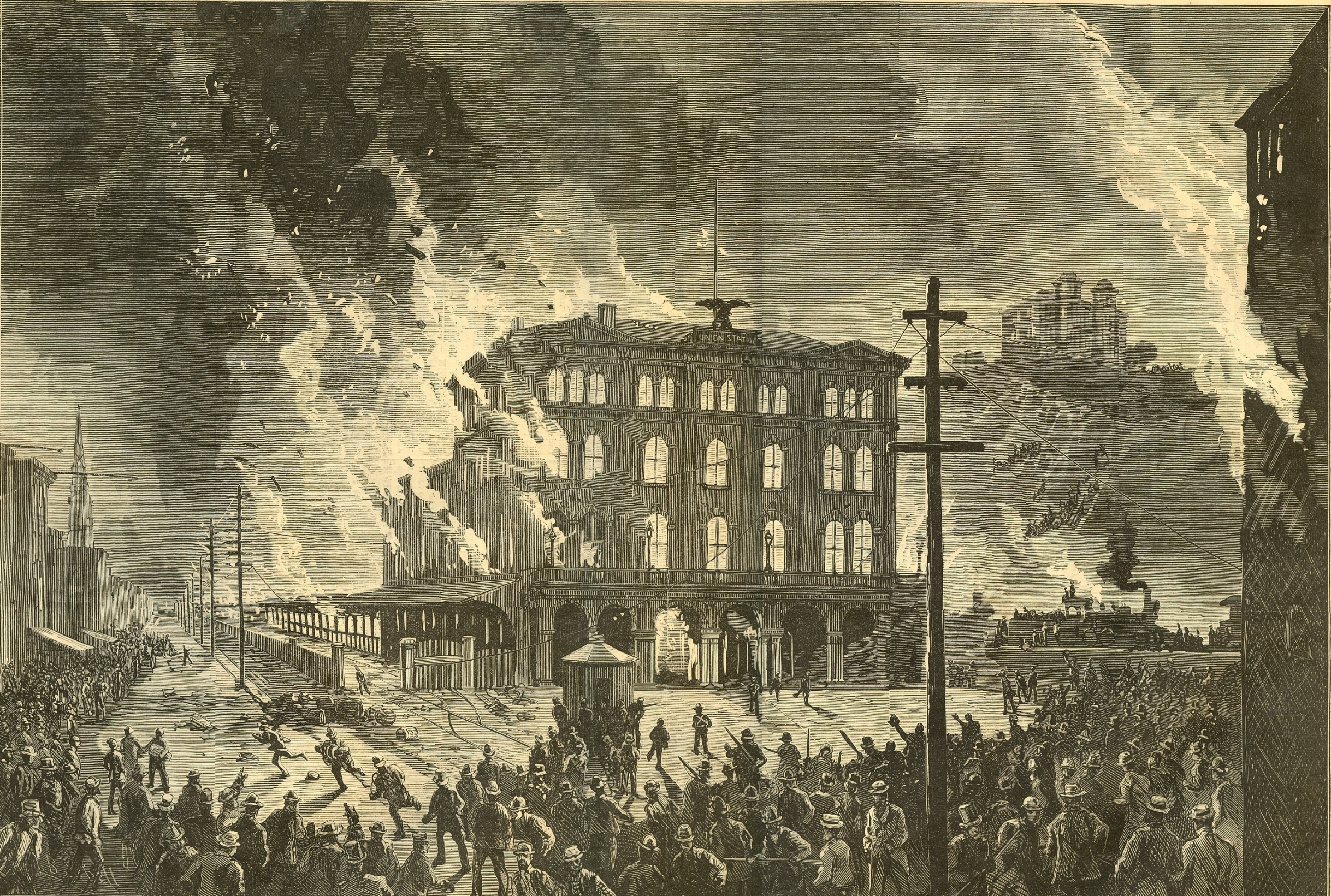
- Burning of Union Depot at Pittsburgh
- Date: July 19–30, 1877
- Location: Pittsburgh, Pennsylvania, U.S.

Casualties
- Deaths: 61
- Injuries: 124
- Arrested: 139

The Pittsburgh railroad strike of 1877 occurred in Pittsburgh, Pennsylvania, as part of the Great Railroad Strike of 1877. It was one of many incidents of strikes, labor unrest and violence in cities across the United States, including several in Pennsylvania. Other cities dealing with similar unrest included Philadelphia, Reading, Shamokin and Scranton. The incidents followed repeated reductions in wages and sometimes increases in workload by railroad companies, during a period of economic recession following the Panic of 1873.

Between July 21 and 22 in Pittsburgh, a major center of the Pennsylvania Railroad, an estimated 61 people (including women and children) were killed in the ensuing riots; strikers burned the Union Depot and 38 other buildings at the Pennsylvania Railroad yards. In addition, more than 120 locomotives and more than 1,200 rail cars were destroyed. Due to track damage, trains did not run for a week following the cessation of violence. Estimates of losses ranged from $2 to $5 million ($50 to $140 million in 2024), according to the railroad company and an 1878 report by a state legislative investigative committee. Pittsburgh was the site of the most violence and physical damage of any city in the country during the Great Strike. Fresh troops arrived in the city on July 28, and within two days peace had been restored and the trains resumed.

Commentators would later place blame for the incident on a range of actors, from the railroad, to reluctant or even sympathetic members of the police and militia, to tramps and vagrants who travelled to the city to take part of the growing public unrest. In the immediate aftermath, the events in Pittsburgh and elsewhere helped to solidify support for various labor groups, which had struggled during the years of the economic downturn.

A number of historical markers have since been erected at points throughout the city of Pittsburgh to commemorate events that took place during the strikes.

== The Long Depression and the Great Strikes ==
Growth rates of industrial production (1850s–1913)
	1850s–1873	1873–1890	1890–1913
Germany	4.3	2.9	4.1
United Kingdom	3.0	1.7	2.0
United States	6.2	4.7	5.3
France	1.7	1.3	2.5
Italy		0.9	3.0
Sweden		3.1	3.5

The Long Depression, sparked in the United States by the Panic of 1873, had far-reaching implications for US industry, closing more than a hundred railroads in the first year and cutting construction of new rail lines from 7,500 miles (12,100 km) of track in 1872, to 1,600 miles (2,600 km) in 1875.

Approximately 18,000 businesses failed nationwide between 1873 and 1875, production in iron and steel dropped as much as 45 percent, and a million or more lost their jobs. In 1876, 76 railroad companies went bankrupt or entered receivership in the US alone, and the economic impacts rippled through many economic sectors throughout the industrialized world.

During the summer of 1877, tensions erupted across the nation in what would become known as the Great Railroad Strike, or simply the Great Strikes. Work stoppage was followed by civil unrest across the nation. Violence began in Martinsburg, West Virginia and spread along the rail lines through Baltimore, and on to several major cities and transportation hubs of the time, including Reading, Scranton and Shamokin, Pennsylvania; a bloodless general strike in St. Louis, Missouri; and a short lived uprising in Chicago, Illinois.

What began as the peaceful actions of organized labor attracted the masses of working discontent and unemployed of the depression, along with others who took opportunistic advantage of the chaos. In total, an estimated 100,000 workers participated nationwide. State and federal troops followed the unrest as it spread along the rail lines from city to city.

=== Pittsburgh ===
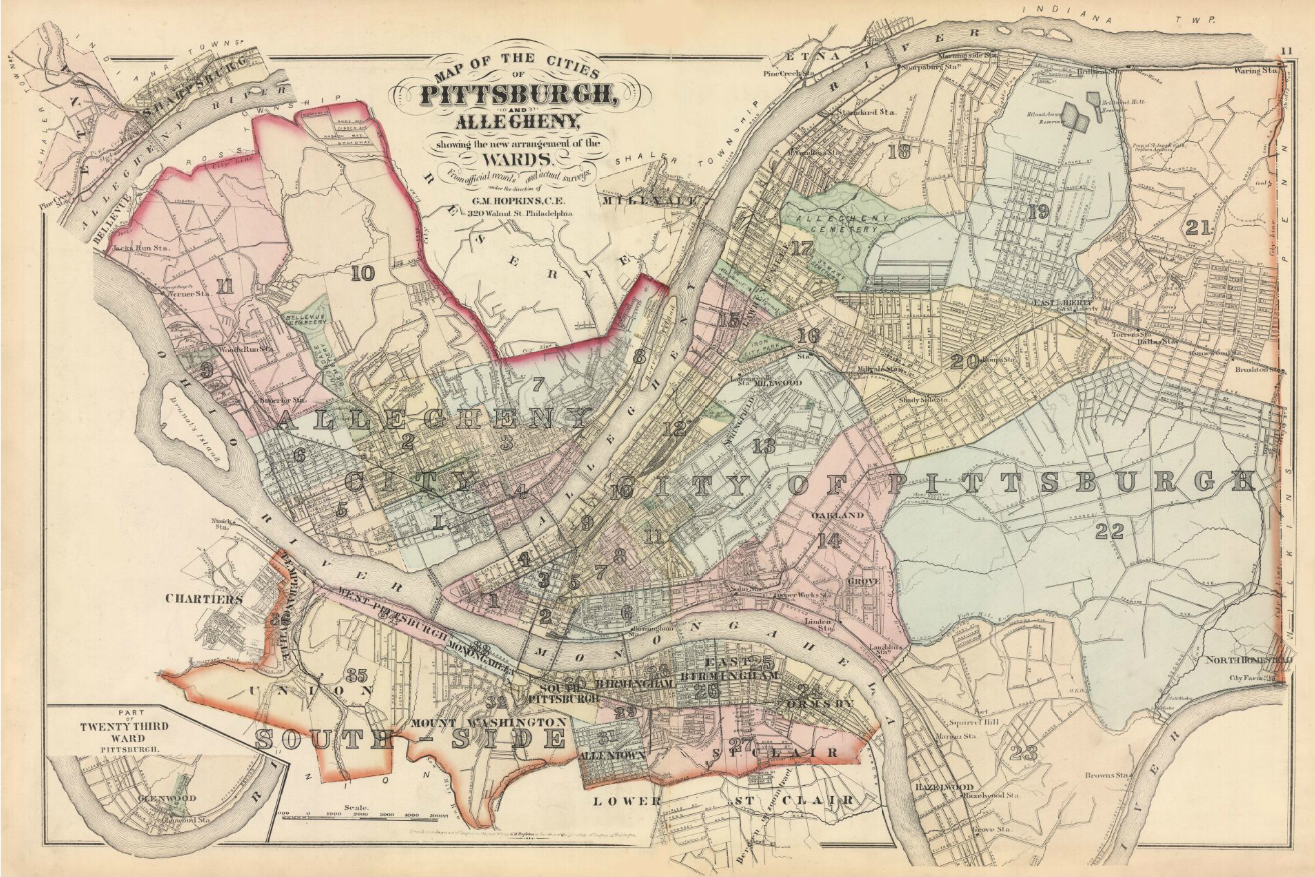
The cities of Pittsburgh and Allegheny, 1876

In 1877, there was a prevailing feeling in Pittsburgh that the city was suffering from the unfair pricing of the Pennsylvania Railroad. The railroad was blamed for costing the city its preeminence in oil refining, and privileging Philadelphia at their expense. Indeed, at this time it cost 20% more to ship freight to San Francisco from Pittsburgh, than from New York, and freight rates from Pittsburgh to Philadelphia were identical to that for the 100-mile-longer (160 km) route from Oil City to Philadelphia.

On June 1, 1877, the Pennsylvania Railroad announced a wage reduction of 10% for all employees and officers making more than a dollar a day, and including a number of other railroads controlled by the company. (Note: Additional impacted railroads included the Pittsburgh, Fort Wayne and Chicago Railway; and the Pan Handle railroad.) This caused a small unsuccessful strike north of Pittsburgh in Allegheny, but was otherwise accepted without disturbance.

The company announced that on July 19, it would implement the practice of double heading (joining two trains' worth of cars into one train with two locomotives) for all trains moving through Pittsburgh. (Note: Superintendent Robert Pitcairn later testified that, at the time, double heading was already done for between one half and two-thirds of trains prior to the announced changes.) This would reduce the number of jobs that were available, require more work, and increase the likelihood of accidents.

The same day double heading was to go into effect, the superintendent of the Pennsylvania Railroad at Pittsburgh issued an order that, according to strikers, effectively doubled the mileage of what was considered a day's work, increasing it from 46 miles (74 km) to 116 (187), without increasing the size of the crews. In total, the company would be able to discharge fully half of their workforce.

The Trainmen's Union was actively organizing on the news. Around the same time, the workers of the Baltimore and Ohio Railroad, which also had a significant presence in Pittsburgh, received a pay cut of their own.

== July 19 ==
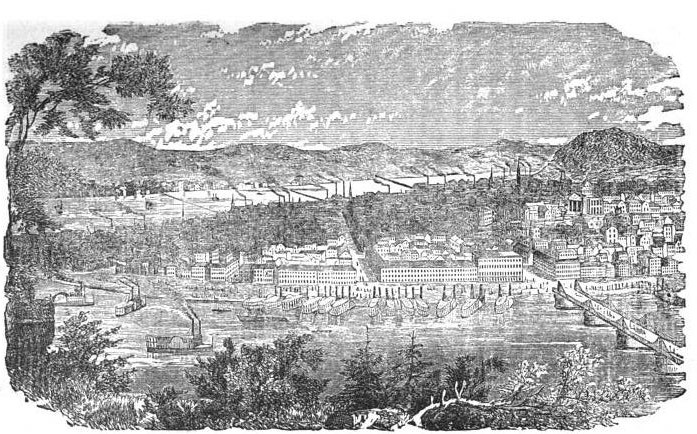
Birds-eye-view of Pittsburgh, c. 1877, with the Monongahela River in foreground

On Thursday July 19, one crew, led by Conductor Ryan, sent word that they would not take out their train. The company called for replacements, and when 25 conductors and brakemen refused to act, they were immediately fired. Yet a third group attempted to take the train but were attacked by the strikers, who moved to the stock yards at East Liberty Street, and convinced the men there to join. Together, at 8:45 am, they captured the main track, took control of the switches, and brought rail traffic to a halt.

David M Watt, acting on behalf of railroad superintendent Robert Pitcairn, who was away, requested assistance from Mayor William C. McCarthy, in clearing the tracks, dispersing the crowd, and resuming operation of the railroad. Due to financial problems, the city's force had been cut in half, and no troops were available as the day force had been entirely disbanded by the city council. The mayor however, allowed the dispatch of some of the previously discharged men so long as they were paid for at the railroad's expense. Between 10 and 17 men were provided.

Watt and his men made their way to the 28th Street crossing to restart traffic. He ordered one man to take control of a switch so that the train could be set on the correct track, and when he refused out of fear for his safety, Watt attempted to do so himself and was struck by one of the strikers, who was arrested over the protests of the crowd.

They then moved to the stock yards at Torrens Station, but at 1:00 pm and again at 4:00 pm they found yet more crowds of strikers preventing the movement of any trains. (Note: At the time, Torrens Station was located at 40.457381°N 79.911032°W, approximately the intersection of Rainbow Street and MLK Jr. East Busway as of 2016, 5.1 miles from the depot on 28th Street.)

After finding the mayor was now out of town in Castle Shannon, Watt and another from the railroad traveled to the residence of Allegheny County Sheriff R. C. Fife. Fife arrived on the scene at 28th Street and ordered the crowd to disperse. They refused, and, having limited means of his own with which to assemble any force to address the situation, Fife dispatched the following to Lieutenant Governor John Latta, and Governor John F. Hartranft:

A tumult, riot, and mob exist on the Pennsylvania Railroad at East Liberty and in the Twelfth Ward of Pittsburgh. Large assemblages of people are upon the railroad and the movement of freight trains either east or west is prevented by intimidation and violence, molesting and obstructing the engineers and other employés of the railroad company in the discharge of their duties. As the sheriff of the county, I have endeavored to suppress the riot, but have not the adequate means at my command to do so, and I therefore request you to exercise your authority in calling out the military to suppress the same.

By midnight, up to 1,400 strikers had gathered in the Pennsylvania Railroad rail yards, which were located on the flats southeast of the Allegheny River, stopping the movement of some 1,500 cars.

The lieutenant governor, through General Albert Pearson, ordered the 6th Division 18th Regiment of the Pennsylvania National Guard from Philadelphia, to assemble to support the sheriff. According to the later testimony of a railroad official, Pearson commented that he believed he could have retaken the station with these available forces, but that it would have resulted in a great loss of life, and he was therefore reluctant to do so.

== July 20 ==
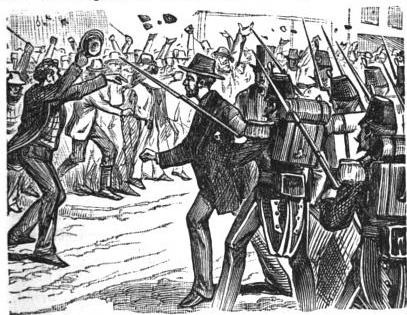
Sheriff Fife calling on the Pittsburgh rioters to disperse

On the morning of Friday the 20th, a large crowd remained at the station near 28th Street, and grew as trains arrived and their crews joined them. The railroad made preparations to move their trains as soon as they might be allowed, and secured sufficient crews to man them, but the locomotives were blocked and could not be moved without injuring members of the crowd, who also maintained control of the switches. Sheriff Fife again commanded those gathered to disperse to no effect.

The men of the 18th and 14th Regiments, Sixth Division were ordered to the scene, where Sheriff Fife again addressed the gathering. He was mocked with jeers of "Bring us a loaf of bread," and "You're creating a riot yourself." Seeing this, General Pearson of the Sixth Division, Pennsylvania National Guard, made his own address. He assured the crowd, through their laughter and cheers, that he had been ordered by the governor to protect the trains from any molestation by the crowd, and ensure that they ran normally:

You that know me know that I will obey orders...I have troops who will obey my orders and I tell you, gentlemen, these trains must go through. My troops will have no blank ammunition, and I give you warning of this in time.

An additional garrison of 180 men of the Duquesne Grays arrived at three o'clock, but were soon joined by a trainload of nearly 1,000 additional strikers. Recognizing that the current force would be insufficient to control the gathering should violence erupt, Pearson sent word to state authorities. The same day, adjutant general and acting governor James W. Latta telegraphed Major General James Beaver:

Situation in Pittsburgh is becoming dangerous. Troops are in sympathy, in some instances, with the strikers. Can you rely on yours?

Workers of the Pittsburgh, Fort Wayne and Chicago and the Pittsburgh, Cincinnati & St. Louis railroads in Allegheny City, also struck and stopped the movement of freight along their lines. (Note: Allegheny was a separate jurisdiction on the north side of the Allegheny and Ohio rivers until it was annexed by Pittsburgh in 1907.)

Governor John Hartranft, en route to California at the time, was notified of the situation and turned back toward Pennsylvania. With freight movement stopped, the economy of the entire region was brought nearly to a standstill. Alexander Cassatt, vice president of the Pennsylvania Railroad, had arrived in the city that morning and was given the demands of the strikers: no more double headers, pay reinstated to the rate prior to June, the rehiring of all those who had been laid off, and the abolishment of pay grades for the workers. The reply to his subordinate, Superintendent Pitcairn, was simply: "Have no further talk with them. They've asked for things we can't grant them at all."

== July 21 ==
=== Shooting ===
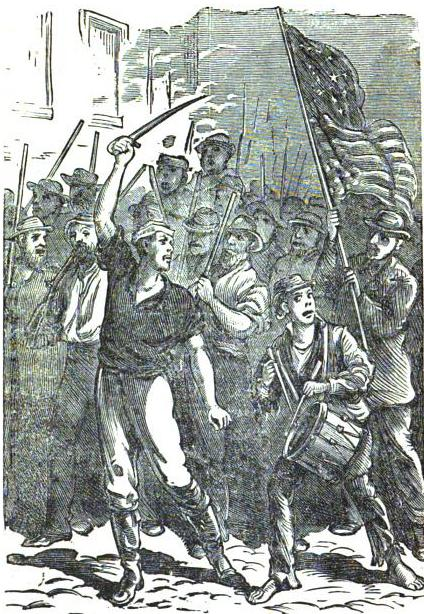
Mob marching to the scene of the action

By the morning of Saturday the 21st, it had become clear that many of the Pittsburgh police and local militia had sided with the strikers and they refused to take action against them. Many of the troops ordered to muster at the rail yards never arrived. Some had relatives among the crowd, and many held sympathy for the workers. In the words of the militiamen: "We may be militiamen, but we are workmen first."

Adjutant General J. W. Latta ordered General Brinton along with his First Division, Pennsylvania National Guard, to report to Pittsburgh. At 3:00 am on the 21st, some 600 of their men set off from Philadelphia. They arrived between 1:00 pm and 1:45 pm, bringing two Gatling guns with them. It was hoped that these troops from the competing industrial city of Philadelphia, would be less sympathetic to the cause of the strikers. Twenty rounds of ammunition were distributed to each man.

At 3:30 pm the order was given for the sheriff and his deputies, accompanied by National Guard troops, to move on the outer depot of the Pennsylvania Railroad, where a large mob had gathered, and arrest the group's leaders. (Note: Fife was accompanied by the 1ST REGT, 1ST BDE, 3D BN, B & C CO; the Washington Grays; the Weccacoe Legion; Vice-President Cassatt; Superintendent Pitcairn of the Pennsylvania Railroad; and 45 deputies. When they arrive on the scene, the 14th and 18th regiments were also present along with Hutchison's Pittsburgh Battery.)

At 28th Street, what troops did arrive found a crowd of 2,000, with another 10,000 nearby, along with the two additional regiments of city troops and one battery. (Note: Dray puts the size of the crowd at 6,000; however, it is not clear what geographical differences in estimating the size of the crowd there may be between McCabe and Dray, given that McCabe distinguished those nearby, an "a immense multitude, at least ten thousand strong")

Fife's attempts to serve his writs met with derision. He read the Riot Act and the troops set forth attempting to disperse the crowd. Some strikers attempted to wrest the rifles from the soldiers, and one was injured in the advance of bayonets. A cry arose of "Stick to it; give it to them; don't fall back!" and some protesters began to throw rocks and fire pistols at the troops; several men were injured, at least one seriously. The troops returned fire and used their bayonets, beginning with a single unordered shot, and continuing in a volley for nearly ten minutes. When the firing ceased, an estimated 20 men, women and children had been killed, with another 29 wounded.

"The sight presented after the soldiers ceased firing was sickening," reported the New York Herald; the area "was actually dotted with the dead and dying." Within five minutes the mob had reformed, infuriated by the killings, although they did not again engage the soldiers.

=== Rioting begins ===
At 6:00 pm, the militia troops were ordered to retreat. Within two hours the mob was moving about the city, sacking shops and breaking into armories and a local gun factory to procure arms. Hearing what had occurred, a group of 600 workingmen from nearby Temperanceville began a march toward Pittsburgh. Throughout the city, the situation quickly deteriorated. As Harper's Weekly reported the situation:

The news of the slaughter of the mob spread through the city like wild-fire, and produced the most intense excitement. The streets were rapidly crowded, and the wildest rumors prevailed. When the news reached the large number of rolling-mill hands and workmen in the various shops of the city, they were excited to frenzy, and by eight o'clock the streets of the central portion of the city were alive with them. A large crowd broke into the manufactory of the Great Western Gun-Works, and captured 200 rifles and a quantity of small-arms, and various other crowds sacked all the other places in the city where arms were exposed for sale, getting about 300 more. Among them were 1,000 mill hands from Birmingham, on the south side.

The rioters fell upon the rail yards, set fire to train cars and locomotives, and prevented any effort at extinguishing them, in some cases at gunpoint.

=== Garrison of the roundhouse ===
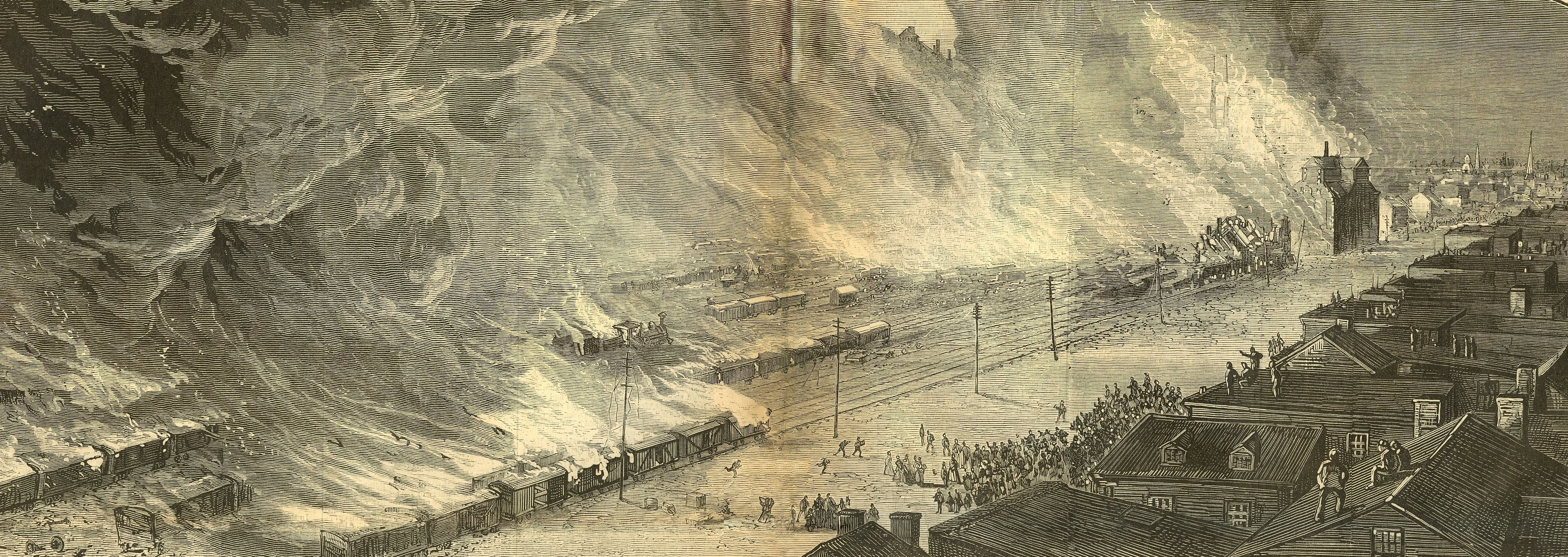
Burning of Pennsylvania Railroad and Union Depot, from Harper's Weekly

A group of Philadelphia Guard soldiers, finding themselves enveloped by the mob, retreated and took refuge in the roundhouse at the train depot. By 10:00 pm, several thousand strikers surrounded the building. For a time, the mob avoided the position for fear of the garrison opening fire. The soldiers saw that a captured artillery piece was positioned within a hundred yards of the roundhouse; they concentrated fire around it to prevent the rioters from manning and firing it. Fifteen men were killed in the endeavor.

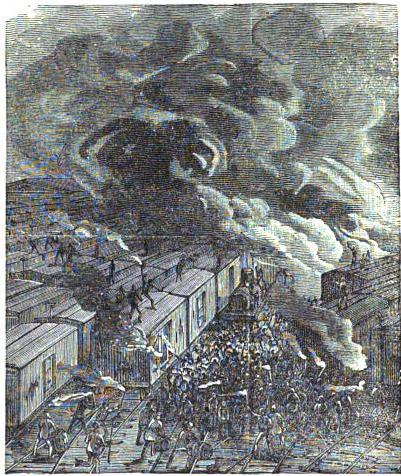
Burning of the freight trains of the Pennsylvania Railroad

The soldiers' shooting initially dissuaded the attackers, but they soon regrouped, and returned fire with pistols and muskets. They eventually resolved to burn the roundhouse, as they had much of the surrounding yard. As one member of the mob phrased it: "We'll have them out if we have to roast them out." Rail cars containing oil, coke, and whisky were set ablaze and forced downhill toward the roundhouse, which began to slowly burn.

At 5:00 am, with the roundhouse alight, the crowd broke and the troops made an orderly escape through Liberty Street, and then on to 33rd, Penn Avenue, and Butler Street, pursued by as many as 1,000 men, and under harassing fire. As one soldier recounted:

It was better to run the risk of being shot down than burned to death, and so we filed out in a compact body ... It was lively times, I tell you, reaching the US Arsenal ... I thought we should all be cut to pieces

According to the legislative report in 1878, the National Guard forces "were fired at from second floor windows, from the corners of the streets...they were also fired at from a police station, where eight or ten policemen were in uniform."

Three troops were killed during the march, as were some protesters. The pursuit broke off after the party crossed the Allegheny River; the troops continued to march until well into the following evening, when they bivouacked near Sharpsburg, on the north side of the Allegheny River.

== July 22 ==
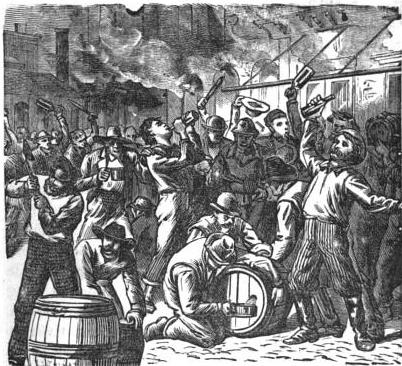
Rioters distributing stolen whiskey

By 7:00 am on the morning of Sunday the 22nd, the fires extended from Millvale station to 20th street.

US Commissioner of Labor Carroll D. Wright would later testify that riots were, in some instances, aided by agents of the railroad company, attempting to destroy aging and soon-to-be replaced cars that they could then charge to the County.

Widespread looting continued. (Note: "Some of the scenes ... were ludicrous in the highest degree ... Here a brawny woman could be seen hurrying away with pairs of white kid slippers under her arms; another, carrying an infant, would be rolling a barrel of flour along the sidewalk, using her feet as the propelling power; then a man pushing a wheelbarrow loaded with white lead; boys hurried through the crowds with large-sized family Bibles as their share of the plunder; while scores of females utilize aprons and dresses to carry flour, eggs, dry goods, etc. Bundles of umbrellas, fancy parasols, hams, bacon, leaf lard, calico, blankets, laces and flour were mixed together in the arms of robust men or carried on hastily-constructed hand-barrows.") Hundreds were engaged in breaking into train cars and distributing their contents, with occasional assistance from police. With the military having retreated, and the large portions of the militia having sided with the rioters, there was little that could be done: "Mayor McCarthy endeavored early in the day to stop the pillage, but the handful of men at his command were unable to control the crowd."

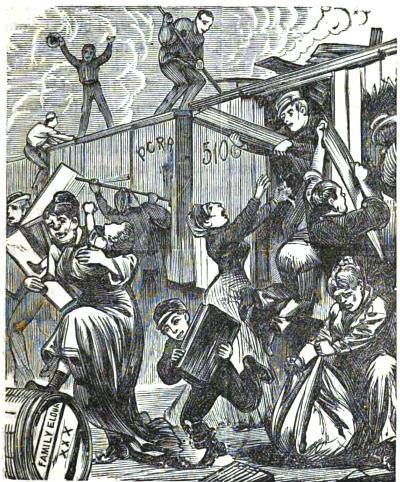
Members of the mob looting freight cars

In Pittsburgh, a citizens' meeting was held at 11:00 am and sent liaisons to meet with rioters, and attempt some type of negotiation, but this failed. Yet more were sent to the treat with authorities from the railroad companies, but none could be found.

At 3:30 pm, a burning rail car was run into the Union Depot and the building set alight. Looters turned their attention to the Cincinnati & St. Louis Railroad, and when the goods there were carried away, it too was set on fire.

The fire department of the city remained on duty throughout the conflagration, and concentrated their efforts on private property along Liberty Street, as they were continuously prevented by the mob from accessing the burning railroad facilities. By the time the Allegheny fire department (then a separate jurisdiction) was dispatched to cross the river and ensure the flames passed no further than Seventh Street, a full three-mile (4.8 km) stretch of the city, between the river and Middle Hill, was burning.

=== Allegheny ===
The disturbance spread north across the river, in the town of Allegheny, where employees of the Pittsburgh, Fort Wayne, and Chicago Railroad voted to strike. They asserted that the assembled militias had no authority (the governor being out of state), raided the local armory, and set up patrols and armed guards in rifle pits and trenches. All freight traffic in the city was brought to a halt, and the strikers took over control of the telegraph and the railroad, and began managing the running of passenger trains.

The strikers exerted such total control over the area that on July 24, when the governor passed through the area, it was Robert Ammon of the Trainmen's Union that assured his safe travel.

== Conclusion and aftermath ==
Few shops opened on the morning of July 23, and there was great anxiety as to whether violence would continue. Many prominent members of the town had set to work organizing a militia, and by this time several thousand had been gathered and were put under the command of General James S. Negley, a veteran of the Civil War.

Word was received that 1,000 miners were en route to the city from the Allegheny, intent on causing further disturbance. They arrived unarmed and were met by two companies of the 19th Regiment, Pennsylvania National Guard, and a squad of local veterans.

One of their leaders made a speech to the effect that they had come on word that the workers of the city were being abused by soldiers. Mayor McCarthy entreated them to return to their homes, and General Negley gave assurances that he was returning his troops to their homes, and that the miners should do the same. They did so throughout the day. (Note: On 23 July, after the troops and the miners dispersed, Mayor McCarthy put out a declaration. "To the Citizens of Pittsburgh: The lawlessness and violence which has boldly defied all authority and all restraint shows that it can only be suppressed through the prompt execution of stern measures. I have determined that peace, order and quiet shall be restored to the community, and to this end now call upon all good citizens to come forward at once to the New City hall and unite with the police and military now organized. I call upon all those who quietly continue at their usual places of business to refrain participating in excited assemblages. All women and children are commanded to retire within their homes and remain there. All places where intoxicating liquors are sold will be closed forthwith, and remain secure and closed until permission is given to reopen the same. And by virtue of the authority vested in me I hereby declare that all riotous demonstrations must and shall be put down, and that peace and order and quiet shall reign throughout the city.")

On July 28, Governor Hartranft arrived in Pittsburgh with fresh militiamen from Philadelphia, in addition to 14 artillery and 2 infantry companies of federal troops. Two days later the railroads began to resume operation.

== Casualties and cost ==
An estimated 53 rioters were killed, and 109 injured, although many hid their injuries to conceal their involvement in the mob. Eight soldiers were killed in clashes, and another 15 were wounded. A total of 139 were arrested.

In total, the riots and fires destroyed 39 buildings, 104 locomotives, 46–66 passenger cars, and 1,200–1,383 freight cars, and overall almost 2 square miles (5.2 km^{2}) of the city was burned. The Pennsylvania Railroad claimed losses of more than $4 million in Pittsburgh. The next year the state legislature established an investigative committee. According to its 1878 report, the railroad claimed $2 million in losses exclusive of freight, and the committee estimated a total of $5 million in loss and damage to the city. One other source estimated the damage as being between four and ten million dollars.

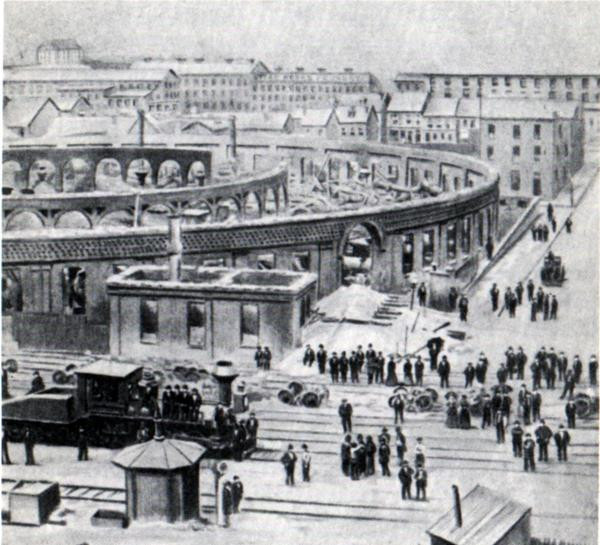
Ruins of the roundhouse

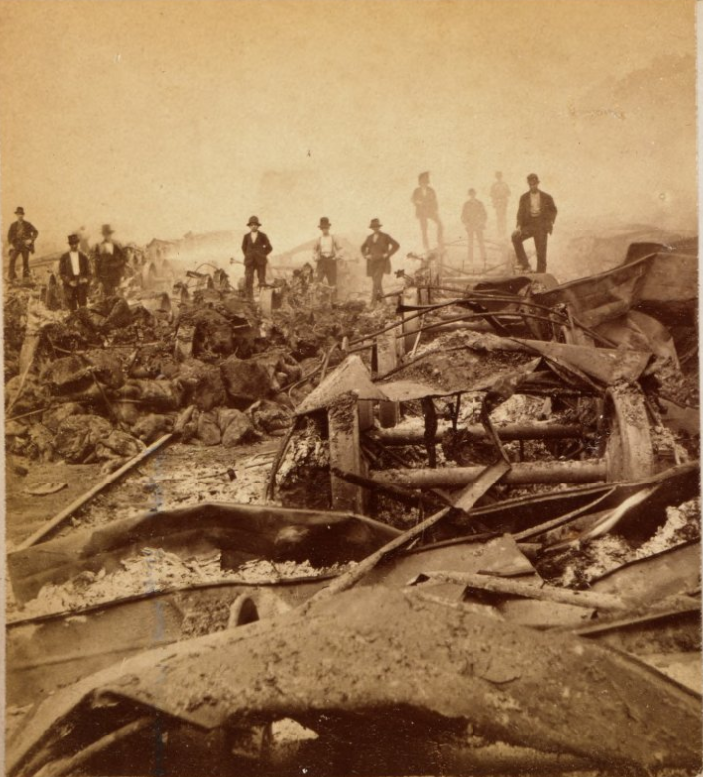
Ruins opposite 20th street

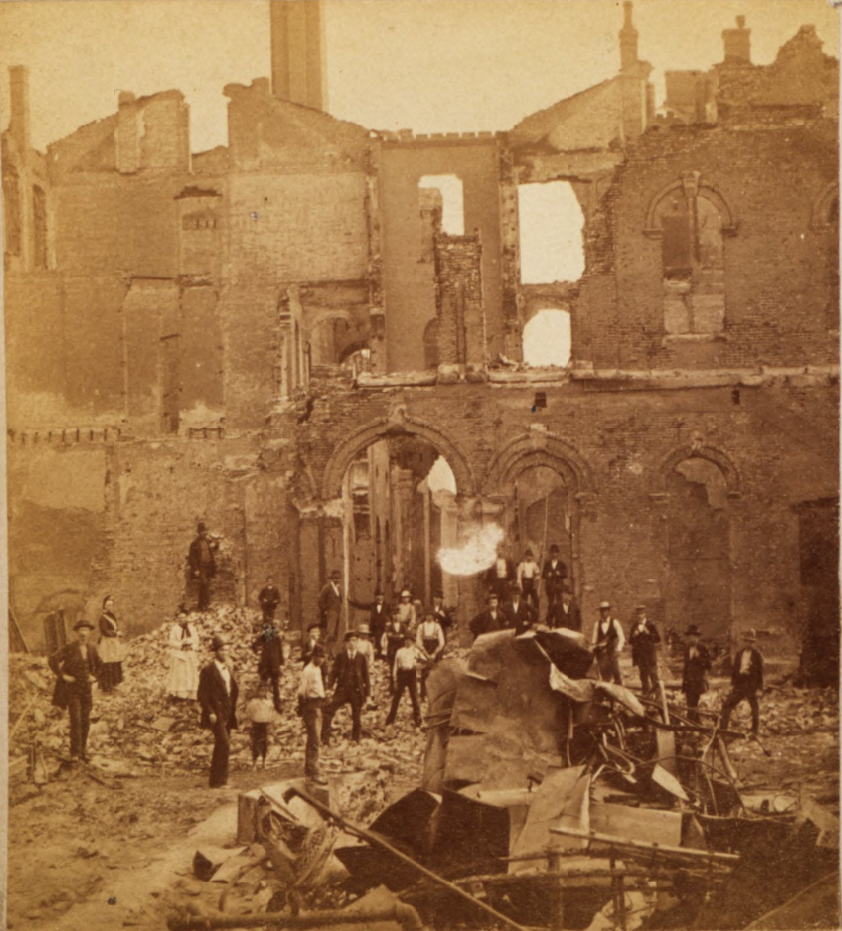
Rear of the Union Depot

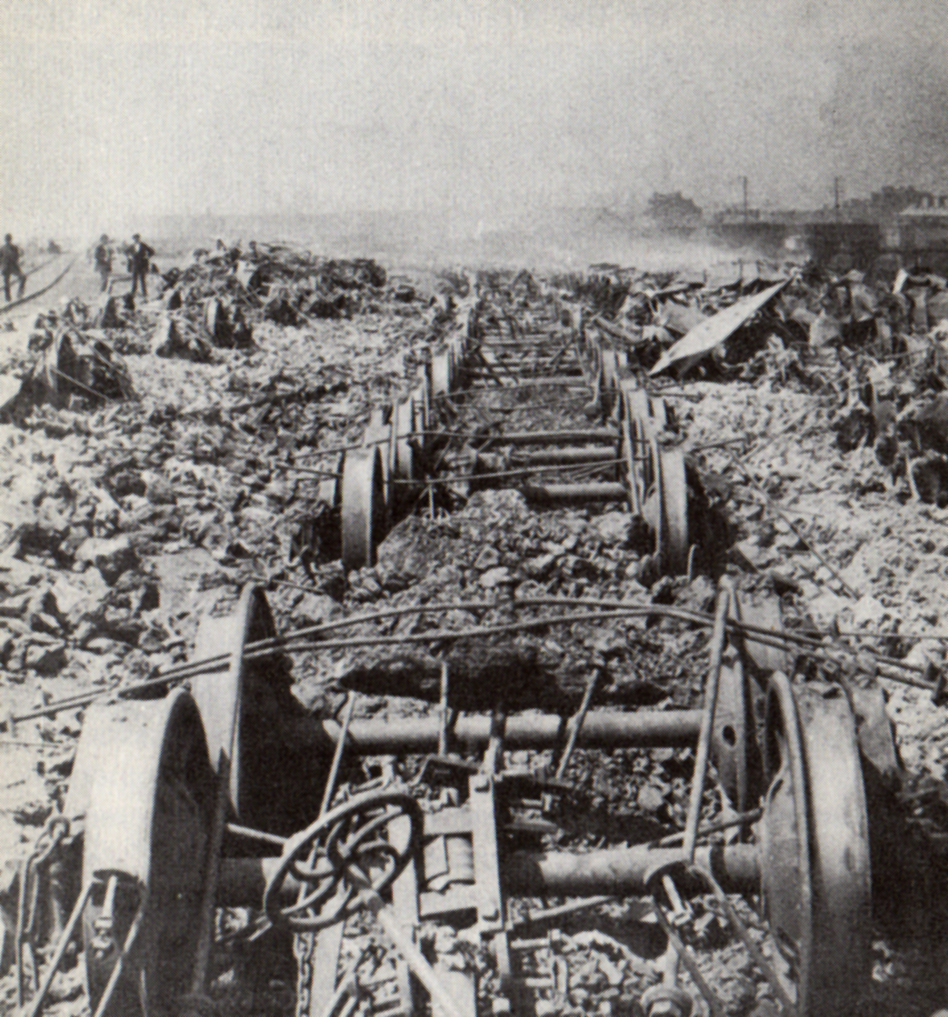
Ruins of the Union Depot

Railroad ties were damaged and twisted by fire, and could not be repaired for a week. During that time, no trains moved through the city. In total, authorities were forced to mobilize 3,000 federal troops, and thousands more in state national guard and local militia to Pittsburgh in order to restore and enforce the peace.

== Examination ==
=== Blame ===
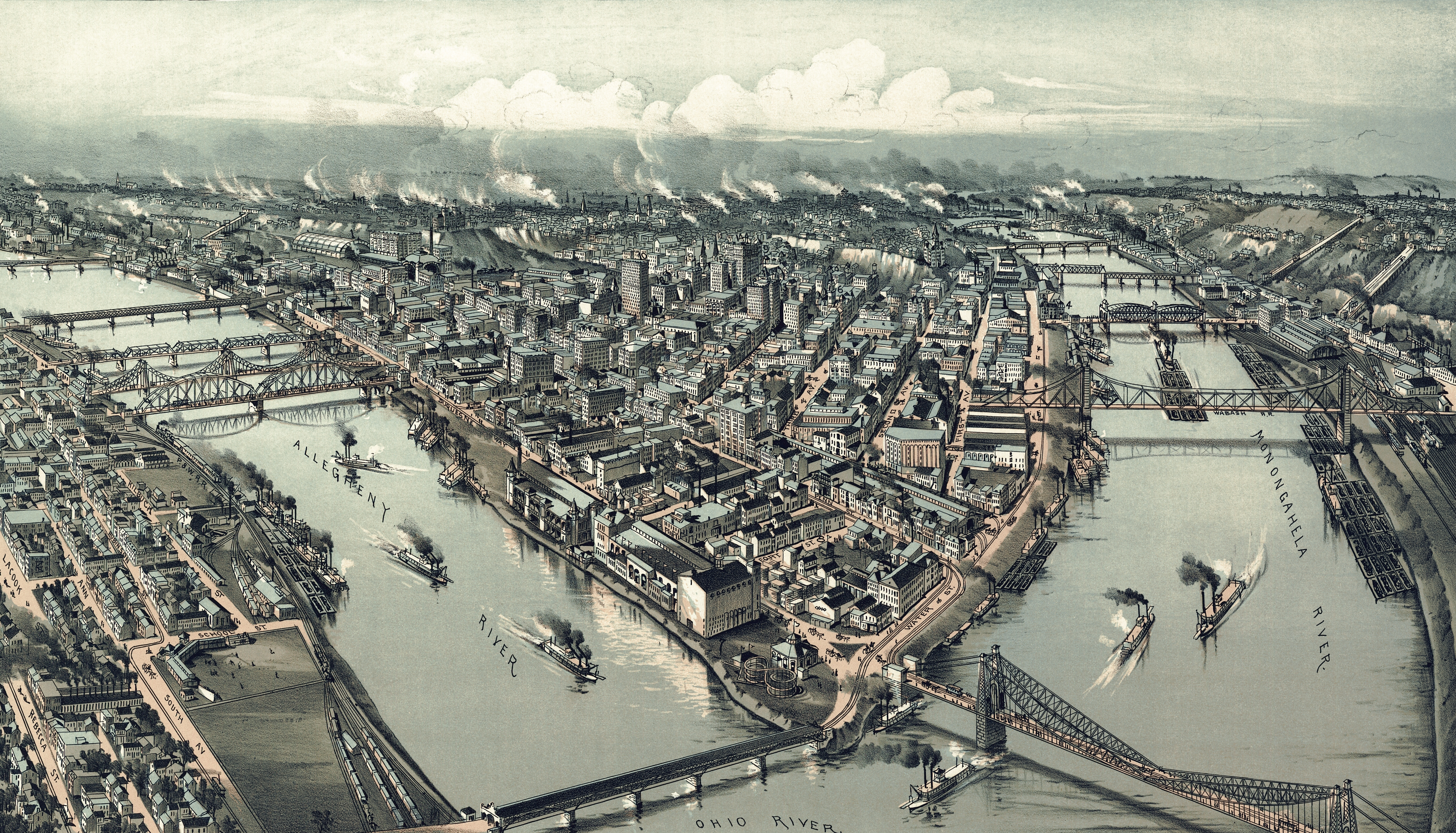
Pittsburgh in 1902. Other yards are south of Monongahela River. Lithograph by Thaddeus Mortimer Fowler.

The pro-labor Pittsburgh National Labor Tribune on July 28, 1877, placed blame squarely on the shoulders of the railroads, writing "there is a point beyond which endurance ceases to be a virtue, a point beyond which it is unsafe to press the workingmen of America." As Lloyd points out, the railroad may not have taken the possibility of strikes or violence seriously, and chose to announce the change to double headers with full knowledge of outbreaks already happening elsewhere around the country. The official who issued the double header order, Robert Pitcairn, told a reporter "the men are always complaining about something."

Similarly, writing in 1984, Couvares characterized the events as being not directed mainly at the railroad as an employer, but against the railroad as a symbol of monopoly, meaning:

The Pennsylvania Railroad, with its immense resources, its dominance of markets, its arrogant treatment of distant customers, its political influence, and its militarized command structure, which turned employees into mere foot soldiers and sometimes into mutineers.

As noted in the state legislative report of 1878, from the beginning of the strike in Pittsburgh, railroad workers were supported by much of the population, who believed the railroads had discriminated against the city in freight rates, making its manufacturing less competitive, and had treated the workers badly. Businessmen and tradesmen were also affected when workers' wages were cut, so many had a stake in the actions of the railroads. Police and local militia were reluctant to act against strikers and many sympathized with, or outright joined them.

For its part, the final report of the Legislative committee placed blame on both labor and capital, but drew a distinction in stages of events as they unfolded. They maintained that the strike, as such, was not an insurrection, and blamed the ensuing riots on "tramps and idle vagrants instead of the railroad workers or the unemployed in general."

For its part, Harper's Weekly saw the essential moral of the strikes and riots as that the maintenance of a strong militia was necessary to maintain order. Their editor, writing that September, asserted:

We frankly own that the scenes at Pittsburgh and Chicago were worthy only of the savages who in earlier years roasted and otherwise tortured the Roman priests in Canada. Riot and anarchy are mere barbarism.

=== Effect on organized labor ===
As French points out, the strike and ensuing riots of 1877 greatly strengthened the cause of organized labor, which had struggled for years, and especially through the depression of the 1870s, to form coherent and effective political and social institutions. He quoted a leader of the Pittsburgh Knights of Labor as saying that the result of the riots was to "solidify and organize the working men," and French continues to clarify, "especially for political action".

=== Demographics ===
The state legislature investigating committee noted an unusual aspect of this strike: the notable participation of women. They supplied strikers with tea and coffee during the first two nights of the strike. They also participated in carrying away goods as the strikers and mob looted rail cars and stores. One study by Bruce suggested that strikers from the railroad composed a minority in the mobs, with most being made up by other industries as well as women and children, or as Bruce phrased it, "boys and halfgrown men". An analysis by Cayne of those arrested, indicated representation from "all ranks of working class men." Couvares echoed this sentiment, calling it an "almost perfect cross-section of Pittsburgh's ethnic and occupational structure."

In addition, large numbers of men who had become unemployed during the depression were camped near the outskirts of the city, making for what Lloyd dubbed "a volatile mix of poverty and anger".

=== Comparisons to the Paris Commune ===
Daucus, in writing about Pittsburgh, drew a connection to earlier violence of the Paris Commune in 1871 and wrote, "The Commune has risen in its dangerous might, and threatened a deluge of blood," and many contemporaries, especially among conservatives, followed suit, wishing to, as Archdeacon phrased it, blame "real domestic dissent, on imaginary foreign machinations." Rhodes also criticized the comparison, saying simply that "writers have pushed their parallel too far."

As Gilje points out, this parallel was used in Pittsburgh and elsewhere by the strike leaders themselves, employing "anticapitalist rhetoric". However, he goes on to point out that this was equally employed by the opponents of organized action, sometimes to deleterious effect as "labeling a movement as anarchist, socialist, or even communist often enabled officials to take preemptive action that, while legal or quasi-legal, often set off popular disorder."

== Commemoration ==
On September 23, 1997, a historical marker was placed at the corner of 28th Street and Liberty in Pittsburgh, commemorating the location of the July 21, 1877 shootings in connection with the strike and ensuing riots. The inscription reads:

In July, unrest hit US rail lines. Pennsylvania Railroad workers struck to resist wage and job cuts. Here, on July 21, militia fatally shot some twenty six people. A battle followed; rail property was burned. The strike was finally broken by US Troops.

Additional historical markers can be found at:

- Penn Avenue near 18th Street
- 21st Street near Penn Avenue
- The corner of 21st Street and Smallman Street
- On Railroad Street at 23rd Street

Former historical markers were located at:

- The corner of 11th Street and Liberty Avenue
- 13th Street, between Penn Avenue and Smallman Street (Note: See the "Google Maps Tour". of event locations and historical markers related to the strike and riots, compiled by the Howling Mob Society.)

== See also ==
- Anti-union violence
- History of rail transport in the United States
- Homestead Strike
- List of incidents of civil unrest in the United States
- List of strikes
- List of worker deaths in United States labor disputes
- Timeline of labor issues and events
