= Labour revolt =

Civil unrest characterized by strong labor militancy and strike activity

A labour revolt or workers' uprising is a period of civil unrest characterised by strong labour militancy and strike activity. The history of labour revolts often provides the historical basis for many advocates of Marxism, communism, socialism, anarchism, and human rights, with many instances occurring around the world in both the 19th and 20th centuries.

== Labour revolts in France ==
The Canut Revolts in Lyon, France, were the first clearly defined worker uprisings of the Industrial Revolution. The First occurred in November 1831 and was followed by later revolts in 1834 and 1848. Following the closure of the national workshops after the 1848 revolution in Paris, there was an uprising in Paris involving 100,000 insurgents involved in a three-day battle with the army, volunteers and reserve forces.

The Paris Commune in France (1871) is hailed by both anarchists and Socialists as the first assumption of power by the working class, but controversy of the policies implemented in the Commune helped the split between the two groups.

== Labour revolts in the United States ==
The earliest revolts in the United States include the pockets of rebellion by slaves and servants acting together in actual uprisings or planned revolts throughout its colonial period. For instance, there was the case of the 1712 incident where 23 slaves who killed nine whites in New York to avenge their harsh treatment. Slaves have also joined farmers in several uprisings against the social system wherein royal authorities, proprietors, trading companies and large land owners were in charge. One of the most dramatic was the uprising in the Royal colony of Virginia in 1676 led by Nathaniel Bacon against the corrupt royal governor, Sir William Berkeley.

The Great Railroad Strike of 1877 and the 1877 Shamokin Uprising occurred in the United States. It is considered the bloodiest labor-management confrontation in U.S. history. The uprising was in response to the railroad executives decision to cut wages and lay off employees due to the economic downturn caused by the panic of 1873. The strike began in July 1877 when workers of the Baltimore & Ohio Railroad blocked railway traffic after the company imposed a 10 percent pay cut. It sparked similar movements among railroad workers everywhere and an estimated 100,000 workers joined the uprising nationwide. The revolt included riots and destruction of railroad property and was met with violent crackdowns. These Revolts led to the progression of labour movements in the United States, therefore in return led to fairer wages, better working conditions, and the overall well being of workers.

The Battle of Blair Mountain in Logan County, West Virginia, U.S. (1921), was the largest organised armed uprising in American Labour History since the Civil War, and had a major impact on labour legislation in the United States. The confrontation was so violent that the then President Warren Harding ordered the aerial bombing of entrenched miner positions.

== Labour revolts in Russia, Germany and Eastern Europe ==
The Revolution of 1905 in led to the creation of the Saint Petersburg Soviet or worker's council which became the model for most Communist Revolutionary Activity. The Soviet was revived in the Russian Revolution and the model was repeated in the German Revolution of 1918–19, The Bavarian Soviet Republic and the Hungarian Soviet Republic.

Some revolutionary activity within the Eastern Bloc resembled Labour Revolts, such as the Uprising of 1953 in East Germany, the Hungarian Revolution of 1956, the Polish 1970 protests although many communists would dispute this as 'Counter-Revolutionary' activity.

== Labour revolts in Great Britain ==
A Red Clydeside was a period of labour and political militancy in the city of Glasgow, Scotland, between the 1910s and the 1930s. Most famously, this resulted in raising the red flag in the Battle of George Square.

== Labour revolts in Spain ==
- The Asturian miners' strike of 1934

== Labour revolts elsewhere ==
Some observers claimed that the protests of 1968 were part of a "revolutionary wave", with much of the activity motivated by students.

- Gwangju massacre in South Korea, 1980
- The Nghe-Tinh Revolt 1930–31 French Indochina
- Brazilian Anarchist Uprising 1917–18
- Saigon Commune, Vietnam 1945

== See also ==
- List of peasant revolts
- Proletarian revolution
- General strike
- Cuno strikes
- Slave rebellion
