= 1877 Shamokin uprising =

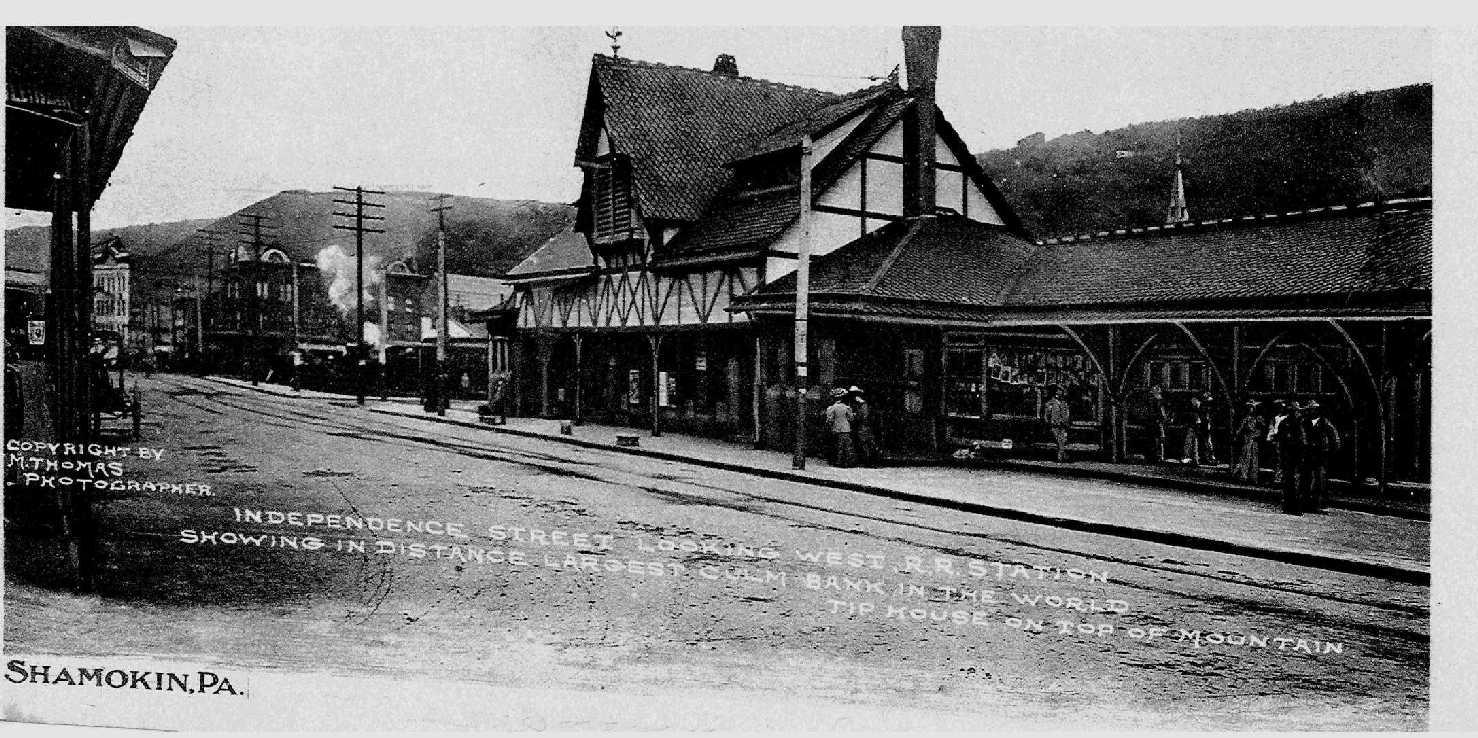
The Reading Depot in Shamokin, Pennsylvania, which was raided in the uprising

The 1877 Shamokin uprising occurred in Shamokin, Pennsylvania, in July 1877, as one of the several cities in the state where strikes occurred as part of the Great Railroad Strike of 1877.

It was the first in the United States in which workers across the country united in an action against major companies. In many cities, the railroad workers were joined by other industrial workers in general strikes.

== Background ==
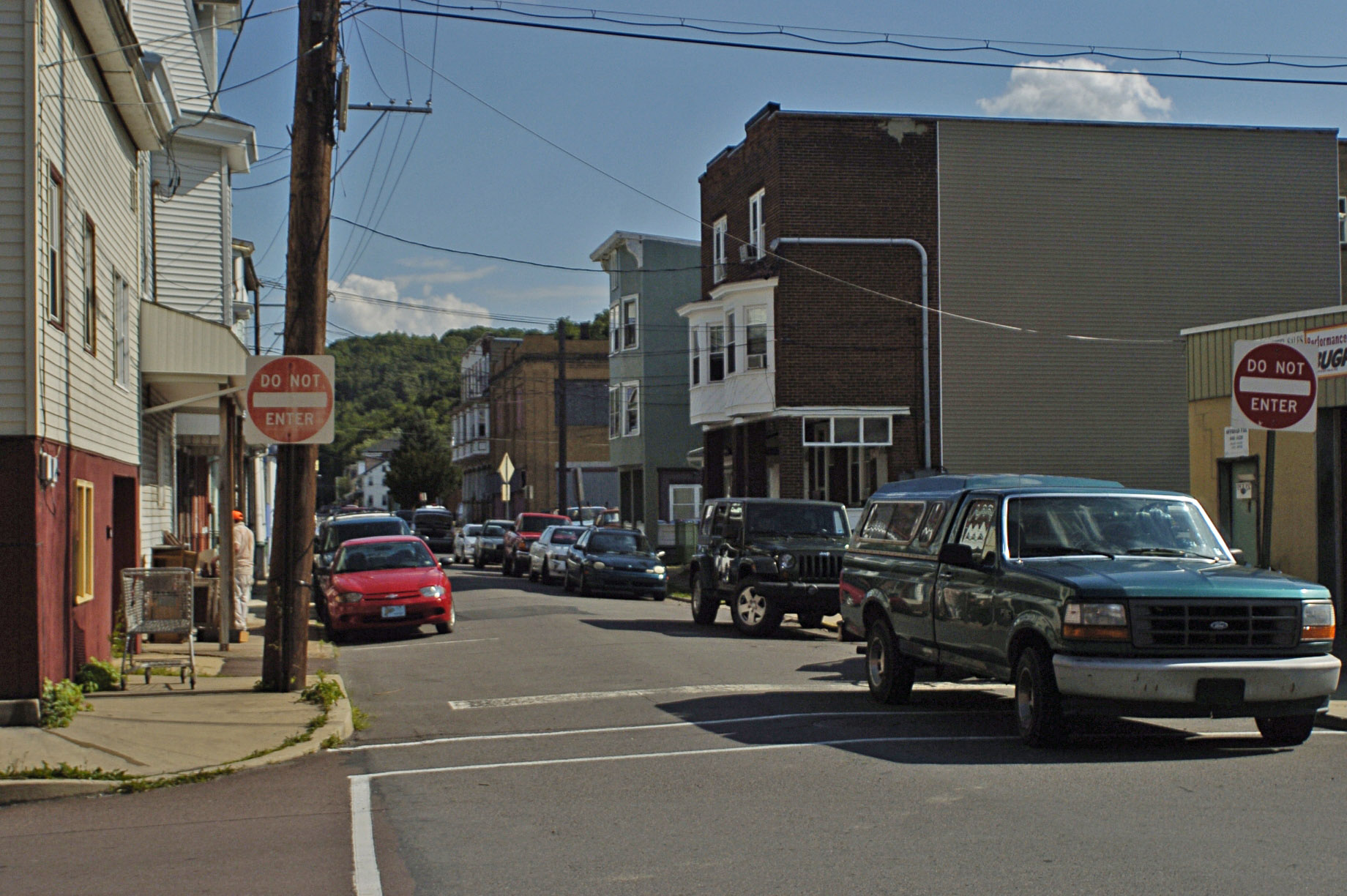
Rock Street in Shamokin, where the 1877 uprising took place

Railroad workers and miners had perilous jobs in the late 19th century. More than 200 railroad workers and 1000 miners died in accidents every year. The companies often forced both groups to buy goods from company stores at inflated prices and work from sunup to sundown. Companies made engineers pay for all train damages, regardless of fault. Children tore their hands picking rocks from coal in collieries.

The first recorded strike in the anthracite coal region of Northeastern Pennsylvania occurred in 1842. More followed in 1849, 1869, and 1872. During the Civil War, the mine owners used cavalry platoons to arrest eight miners and evict them from company homes for striking in Locust Gap. At that time, the workers in Locust Gap formed the Miner's Benevolent Society, to provide accident insurance and demand better pay. It was one of the first unions in America.

The Workers' Benevolent Association, founded in St Clair in 1868, expanded to Northumberland County, including Locust Gap, on October 19, 1869. It built on the efforts of previous unions like the Miners Benevolent Society. It continued as one of the early ways that workers organized for mutual benefit.

By 1872, the Reading Railroad was the biggest mine company in the anthracite region. It used its monopoly on the railroads to take over 70,000 acres (280 km^{2}) of the best coal lands. The company's president was Frank Gowen. Gowen Street in Shamokin and even Gowen City were named after him. Gowen established a private police force, called the "Reading Coal and Iron Police." Between 1871 and 1875 Gowen borrowed $69 million to pay for his empire. But he and the other railroad barons had overestimated the demand for train service and over-invested. Debts forced them to fire many workers, resulting in a nationwide depression in the Panic of 1873.

In 1874 a third of Pennsylvania's workforce was unemployed. The Reading Railroad cut train workers' wages by 10%, resulting in an unsuccessful strike. In 1875 only 1/5 of American workers had full-time jobs. Some people vented their frustration by damaging tracks, trains, and mines. On May 11, 1875, the trestle at Locust Gap Junction was exploded. It is believed to have been a protest by unemployed men. The telegraph office at Locust Summit was burned. From 1860 to 1909 arson destroyed 25 collieries between Mount Carmel and Trevorton. Knoebels Amusement Resort has a Mining Museum with a mural of the twice-burned Locust Gap colliery.

The July 1875 Officers of the Miners' and Laborers' Benevolent Association for Northumberland County, Pennsylvania, included: Pres. John N. Evans Mt. Carmel; VP Dennis Coming Locust Gap; Sec. Ben Ressler, Excelsior; Treas. John L. Shanahan, Mt. Carmel. In the Mt. Carmel District the following officers were elected: Pres. Lewis Dietrich; VP Pat Donnal; Sec. John L. Shanahan; Treas. Julius Maure; Trustees Patrick Donlan, Patrick Nowlan, and Thomas Perry.

== Overview of events ==
When Gowen lowered mining wages to 54% of their 1869 level, miners began the "Long Strike" of 1875. It started in January 1875 and lasted 170 days. But Gowen stored enough coal to outlast the strike and crushed the miner's union by firing its members.

In July 1875, Gowen presented "A List of Outrages in the Schuylkill and Shamokin Regions" to Pennsylvania's legislature, including:

- March 25, 1875 – Locust Summit telegraph burned, 32 coal cars dumped on tracks at Locust Gap
- March 26–29 – coal cars dumped at Locust Gap Junction
- March 29 – coal trains stoned near Locust Gap
- March 31 – between Locust Gap and Alaska stations, men stoned and fired upon a train. The men boarded the train, drove out the crew, damaged the engine, and blocked tracks
- April 29 – provisions stolen from Mount Carmel freight depot
- May 1 – flour and feed stolen from freight car in Locust Gap
- May 6 – attempt to blow up trestle in Locust Gap
- May 7 – hose cut from water columns at Locust Gap and Summit

Gowen accused leaders of the Irish community of running an alleged secret society called the "Molly Maguires" that killed mine officials. He used private police to investigate and company lawyers to prosecute. Catholics and Irish were excluded from local juries. Beginning in June 1877, 20 "Molly Maguires" were convicted and executed, often despite strong evidence of innocence.

The Reading Railroad lowered miners' wages 10–15% twice between 1876 and 1877. Many workers were reduced to having only bread and water for their meals. Some families killed and ate pets.

Gowen decreed that railroad workers had to leave their benevolent association and join the company's insurance plan, which covered them only when they were working. In response, the trainmen went on strike in April 1877. Gowen replaced them with scabs whose inexperience caused many accidents. Gowen refused to rehire the fired workers, and destroyed the Brotherhood of Railroad Engineers.

In July 1877 the United States was deep in the depression. The previous year the total revenues of America's railroads fell by $5.8 million. But they raised profits to $186 million (up $0.9 million) by cutting wages. Most owners received 10% dividends. In July 1877 railroads across America conspired and lowered wages another 10%. Train brakemen and firemen's wages came to $30 per month.

=== Strike begins ===
When they found out about the wage cuts on July 16, trainmen in Baltimore left work, sparking the Great Railroad Strike of 1877. Before the strikes ended, more than 80,000 trainmen and 500,000 other industrial workers from Boston to Kansas City also went out on strike, although there were not yet official unions. The workers joined in their grievances and the knowledge that the railroads affected everyone. In Pittsburgh on July 21 a National Guard unit from Philadelphia, ordered in by the Pennsylvania governor, fatally shot 20 unarmed strikers and bystanders, including women and three children, and wounded 29 more in an effort to suppress a growing protest against the Pennsylvania Railroad. The crowds retaliated by burning the railroad's buildings, more than 120 train engines, and 1200 freight cars; the south side of the city was burning for 3 miles (4.8 km) in the railroad flats along the Monongahela River. The next day troops shot more protesters, raising the total of Pittsburgh's dead to over 40. In Pittsburgh and Saint Louis, Missouri, the railroad workers were strong enough to take over management, run trains, and collect tickets. In Hornellsville, New York, when scabs started a train up a mountain, strikers soaped the tracks. The train went up, slowed, stopped; the passenger cars were unhooked and slid back down the mountain.

In Reading on July 22, with the Reading Railroad 2 months in arrears of paying wages, crowds of women and children watched as strikers blocked the tracks. The governor again ordered National Guard units to the city. When people threw bricks at the troops, the soldiers opened fire in all directions, killing 10 and wounding 40, including 5 local police.

That evening in Sunbury, rumors circulated that a unit of the National Guard would pass through on the way to crush Pittsburgh's strike. An agitated crowd gathered at the railroad junction at 3rd and Chestnut streets. The soldiers took another route. When a freight train tried to leave, the railroad workers took it over and sent it back.

On July 23 the trainmen met at Red Men's Hall. They decided to join the national strike and continue blocking freight trains until the railroads lifted the 10% reduction. The next morning they ordered the shop mechanics to leave work too.

In Danville on the morning of July 23, the workers appointed a group to ask the Commissioner of the Poor for bread or work. The commissioner left it to the mayor to decide. At 3 p.m. a large crowd gathered at the weigh scales on Mill Street in the middle of Danville. One speaker said, "We will give the borough authorities until tomorrow at 10:00 to devise some action to give us work or bread. If at that time nothing is done for us, we will take [expletive] wherever we can find it." John Styer discussed their poverty and demanded government aid. The town newspaper reported unless the borough council banished starvation, "disorder would ensue. Men would take the law into their own hands."

The next day there was almost a bread riot. Citizens were on the verge of starvation. Grocers brought their flour inside for safety, and farmers left markets with half their goods sold. At noon crowds led by Ben Bennet and former constable Frank Treas took a few old muskets from an abandoned storehouse. They rushed for weapons known to be stored in the third story of the Danville National Bank on Mill and Northumberland streets. Police met them. One policeman tried to arrest Treas, for using incendiary language. But he could not get to Treas in the dense crowd. A sign on Bloom Street proposed a meeting of workingmen in Sechler's Woods on July 26. Following these events, the authorities gave food to those in need.

=== July 24, beginning of incident ===
In Shamokin on the morning of July 24, miners struck at the Big Mountain Colliery. Ten families in a row of houses had no food for 3 weeks, except a few scraps from their gardens. At 2 p.m. a large meeting of workers on Slope Hill demanded work or food.

The next day they repeated their demands at Union Hall on Rock Street. William Oram, the attorney for both the borough and the Mineral Railroad & Mining Company, told the crowd that the borough and wealthy citizens would give them street work for 80 cents a day.

The crowd appointed a Workingmen's Committee to negotiate with the borough council that night for a higher rate. The committee demanded $1.00 a day, and the borough agreed. But when the committee returned to Union Hall, the crowd rejected the $1.00 offer.

One thousand men and young people marched down Rock Street and Shamokin Street. When someone threw a stone through Shuman & Co.'s Store, the crowd surged forward into the Reading Railroad station and depot on Shamokin and Independence streets. (Now the site of a parking lot.) They broke the glass in windows and doors, took the freight from the cars and everything in the building, and gutted it. Next they crossed Liberty Street toward the Northern Central Depot on Commerce Street.

Meanwhile, Mayor William Douty gathered a citizen posse or militia outside City Hall in response to a prearranged signal - a bell ringing at his Presbyterian church. Douty managed his family's coal mines and collieries at Big Mountain, Doutyville, and Shamokin. He also persecuted the Molly Maguires. Douty's militia marched down Lincoln and Liberty streets armed with muskets and revolvers. They told the crowd to leave, and when that failed, shot into it. They wounded 12 people and killed two, neither of whom were involved in the uprising. Mr. Weist was shot dead while closing his candy store on Liberty and Independence streets; Levi Shoop was the second fatality. The crowd escaped to the town's outskirts. The mayor's militia took back control of the train stations and patrolled the town. According to rumors, after retreating, the workers tore up the tracks a few miles east of town.

In November, Phillip Wiest, wounded in the militia shooting, was tried for leading the riot. Despite having received serious injuries, he was imprisoned for 8 months in the Northumberland County jail. In addition, James Richards, Peter Campbell, Christian Neely, and James Ebright were convicted and imprisoned for 7, 6, 4, and 3 months, respectively, on charges of rioting and burglary.

In Shenandoah on July 25, 800-1000 workers paraded down the streets with flags and a drum corps. When they got to the baseball field at 10 p.m., they could see that arsonists had set fire to the mining stables in nearby Lost Creek. On July 27, Shenandoah's miners brought business of all kinds to a standstill.

Elsewhere railroads and local and state authorities crushed the strike using coal and iron police, militia, and state units of the National Guard. Across the United States, these "forces of order" killed more than 100 people. It was not a complete defeat for the strikers, however. The strike showed the conflict of interests between working people and management. If corporations pushed people too far, they would react out of desperation. And the strike showed that if workers acted together, they could challenge the corporate system. By organizing into unions, workers could mobilize their strength.

== See also ==
- Great Railroad Strike of 1922
- Great Southwest railroad strike of 1886
- List of worker deaths in United States labor disputes
- List of incidents of civil unrest in the United States
- Timeline of labor issues and events
