= Great Southwest railroad strike of 1886 =

American labor strike

Great Southwest strike of 1886
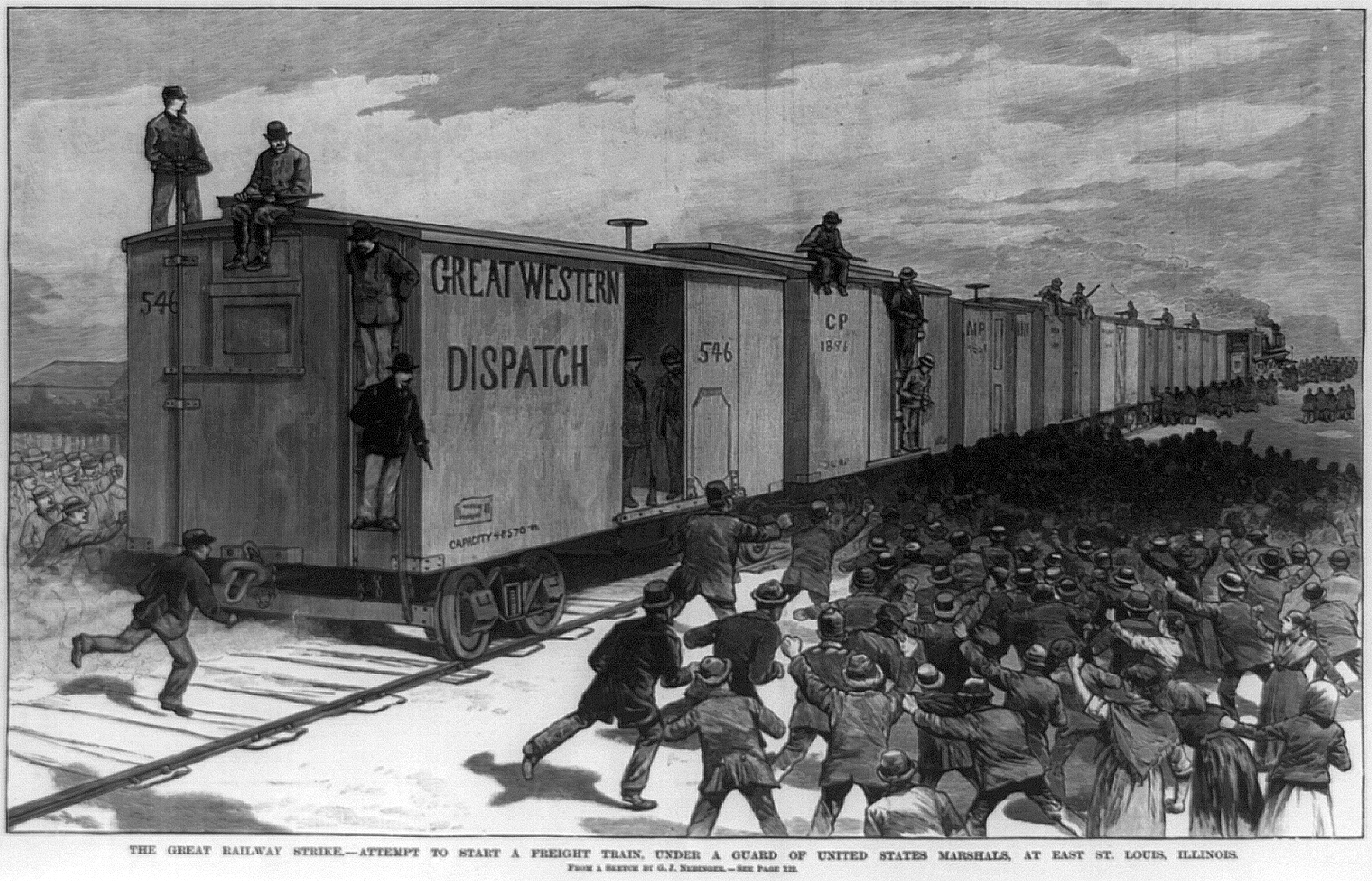
- U.S. Marshalls attempt. to start a train during the strike in East St. Louis, Illinois.
- Date: March 1 – May 4, 1886
- Location: Arkansas, Illinois, Kansas, Missouri, Texas
- Methods: Strike, protest, sabotage

Parties
| Knights of Labor (KOL); Railroad workers | Union Pacific Railroad; Missouri Pacific Railroad; Pinkerton Agency; Strikebreakers |

Lead figures
| Martin Irons (KOL leader of DA #101) | Jay Gould (Railroad owner) |

Number
| 200,000 | |

Casualties and losses
| Deaths: 7 | Deaths: 2 |

The Great Southwest railroad strike of 1886 was a labor union strike involving more than 200,000 workers. Beginning on March 1, railroad workers in five states struck against the Union Pacific and Missouri Pacific railroads, owned by Jay Gould. At least ten people were killed. The unravelling of the strike within two months led directly to the collapse of the Knights of Labor and the formation of the American Federation of Labor.

== Background ==
The roots of the strike began in a pattern of labor actions, negotiations and temporary agreements all through 1885. The Knights of Labor and Jay Gould's Union Pacific Railrorad had reached an agreement that included the principle that "no man should be discharged without due notice and investigation." This was purportedly violated where a Knight named Charles A. Hall in Marshall, Texas, was fired for attending a union meeting on company time. The District Assembly 101 of the Knights and its leader Martin Irons called a strike.

Irons, who first became a member of the Knights of Labor in 1884 was instrumental in forming District Assembly 101, which was composed of workers employed by Gould’s southwestern railroads. Irons eventually became the chairman of the executive committee of the union assembly, and later became known as the leader of the strike. Irons believed and fought for a broad and comprehensive union for labor on the premise that it would counterbalance the power of aggregated and incorporated wealth.

== Strike ==
Within a week, more than 200,000 workers were on strike throughout Arkansas, Illinois, Kansas, Missouri and Texas. A headline in the St. Louis Post-Dispatch read "Traffic Throttled: The Gould System at the Mercy of the Knights of Labor." At the time of the strike, Gould held some 12% of all railroad track in the U.S. But the Brotherhood of Locomotive Engineers and Trainmen refused to honor the strike, and its members kept working. Meanwhile, Gould immediately hired strikebreakers to work the railroad, some of them Pinkerton agents.

No serious violence was reported up through March 10. One strikebreaker was reportedly beaten in Fort Worth. Increasing acts of sabotage, though, bordered on lawlessness: assaulting and disabling moving trains, threatening notes and visits to working engineers, arson in yards, and a crowd of 600 Knights and sympathizers in DeSoto, Missouri marching on the roundhouse to drain the locomotives' boilers. A favorite tactic of the rail workers was to let steam locomotives go cold, forcing the railroad to spend up to six hours slowly reheating the engines for use.

On March 19 Grand Master Workman Terence V. Powderly of the Knights of Labor met in Kansas City, Missouri with other leaders of the Knights, the governors of Kansas and Missouri, and railroad officials to try to bring an end to the strike. The meeting continued for two days, but the parties were unable to reach an agreement.

=== Casualties and martial law ===
Gould and his railroad executives continued to resist meeting any strike demands. On April 3, Tarrant County Deputy Richard Townsend was shot and killed in a confrontation between officers and a crowd of about 500 in Fort Worth. Two other deputies were also wounded. On April 9 in East St. Louis, Illinois, where about 80 switchmen had gone out on a sympathy strike against the Louisville and Nashville Railroad, violence broke out when a crowd of strikers met with eight deputies guarding a freight train. The guards shot into the threatening crowd, killing six bystanders and narrowly avoiding shooting Mayor Maurice Joyce. The angered crowd answered by setting the rail yards on fire.

After these incidents, Gould requested military assistance from the governors of the affected states. The governor of Missouri mobilized the state militia; the governor of Texas mobilized both the state militia and the Texas Rangers. The governor of Kansas refused after local officials reported no incidents of violence, despite claims by railway executives that mobs had seized control of trains and that rail yards were burning.

On April 26 sabotage caused the derailment of a freight train near Wyandotte, Kansas, where two non-striking crewmembers were buried in wreckage and in the mud of the Kaw River. Six Knights were charged with the crime on the evidence of an informer. On April 8 a striker named John Gibbons was fatally shot by a "non-union switchman and private watchman" in St. Louis.

The exercise of state police power on behalf of the railways led union members to retaliate. As the violence spread, public opinion turned against the workers. The physical attacks by the Pinkerton agents scared thousands of workers into returning to work. The strike was officially called off on May 4.

== Aftermath ==
The failure of the strike represented the first major defeat sustained by the Knights of Labor. When the strike did not draw the support of the engineers and other industrial workers, the Knights' vision of an industrial union withered as well. Internal conflict broke out between various factions within the Knights, paralyzing the union.

The strike, the Haymarket affair, and the collapse of the 1887 sugar strikes in Louisiana demoralized the Knights of Labor and energized management. By 1890, membership in the Knights of Labor had plummeted by 90 percent. Employers adopted a model for stamping out strikes that called for holding firm and calling for government troops.

While the collapse of the railroad strike set the American labor movement back, alleged organizational problems within the Knights of Labor also became apparent. This led Samuel Gompers of the cigar makers union, Peter J. McGuire of the carpenters union and others to organize what they considered a more effective labor organization. On December 8, 1886, these men and a few other delegates met in Columbus, Ohio, to create the American Federation of Labor.
