= Timeline of labour issues and events =

The following is a timeline of labor history, organizing and conflicts, from the early 1600s to present.

== 1600s ==
1619 (United States)
1619 Jamestown Polish craftsmen strike.

1636 (United States)
Maine Indentured Servant's and Fisherman's Mutiny.

1648 (United States)
Boston Coopers and Shoemakers form guilds.

1661 (United States)
Virginia's Indentured Servants' Plot.

1663 (United States)
Maryland Indentured Servants' Strike.

1675 (United States)
Boston Ship Carpenters' Protest.

1676 (United States)
Bacon's Rebellion in Virginia.

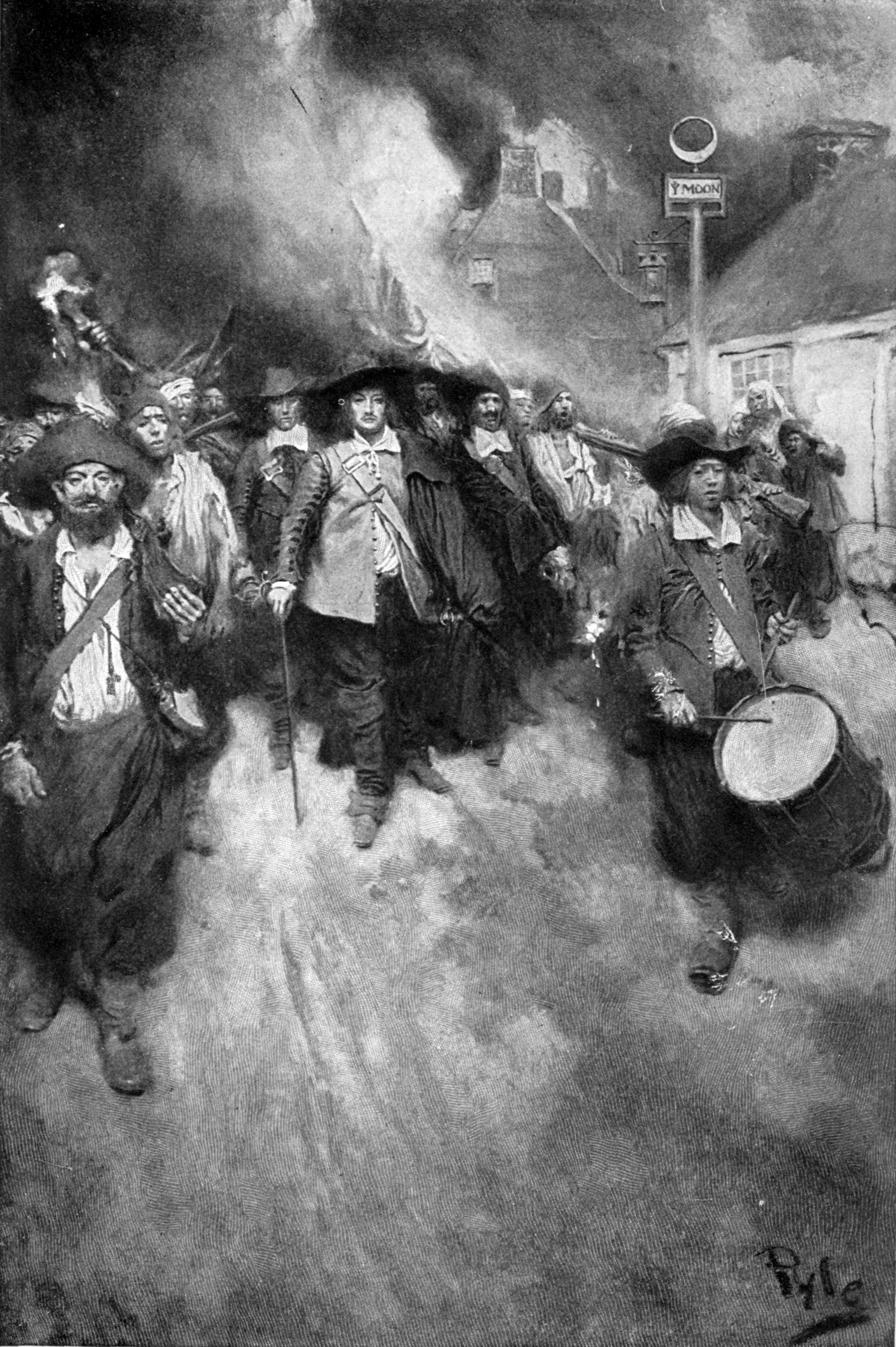
The Burning of Jamestown by Howard Pyle depicts the burning of Jamestown, Virginia during Bacon's Rebellion (1676–77).

1677 (United States)
New York City Carter's Strike.

1684 (United States)
New York City Carter's Strike.

== 1700s ==
1741 (United States)
New York City Bakers' Strike.

1768 (United States)
Florida Indentured Servants' Revolt.

1774 (United States)
Hibernia, New Jersey, Ironworks Strike.

1778 (United States)
Journeymen printers in New York combine to increase their wages.

1781 (Austria)
Holy Roman Emperor, Joseph II, issues the Serfdom Patent of 1781, to abolish serfdom throughout the Habsburg lands.

1791 (United States)
Philadelphia carpenters conduct first strike in the building trades in the United States.
1792 (United States)
Philadelphia has first local union in the United States organized to conduct collective bargaining.
1794 (United States)
Federal Society of Journeymen Cordwainers formed in Philadelphia.

1797 (United States)
Profit sharing originated at Albert Gallatin's glassworks in New Geneva, Pennsylvania.

1799 (England)
Combination Act 1799 (39 Geo. 3. c. 81) outlawed trade unionism and collective bargaining by workers.

== 1800-1829 ==
1805 (United States)
Journeymen Cordwainers union includes a closed-shop clause in its constitution in New York City.

1806 (United States)
Commonwealth v. Pullis was the first known court case arising from a labor strike in the United States. After a three-day trial, the jury found the defendants guilty of "a combination to raise their wages" and fined.

1816 (England)
Food riots broke out in East Anglia. Workers demanded a double wage and for the setting of triple prices for food.

1824 (England)
The Combination Act 1799 (39 Geo. 3. c. 81) was repealed.

1824 (United States)
Pawtucket, Rhode Island, Textile Strike.

1825 (United States)
United Tailoresses of New York organized in New York City.

1825 (United States)
Boston House Carpenter's Strike

1827 (United States)
Mechanics' Union of Trades' Associations formed in Philadelphia.

1827 (United States)
Philadelphia Carpenter's Strike.

1828 (United States)
Workingmen's Party was organized in Philadelphia by the Mechanics' Union of Trades' Associations.

23 April 1829 (United States)
Committee of Fifty, a group of prominent trade unionists in New York City, organized to resist efforts by business owners to revoke the 10-hour workday and reinstate the 11-hour workday. Their efforts lead directly to the forming of the Workingmen's Party of New York.

1829 (United States)
Workingmen's Party of New York formed.

== 1830s ==
1831 (United States)
New England Association of Farmers, Mechanics, and other Workingmen formed.

9 January 1831 (England)
Twenty-three workers from Buckingham were sentenced to death for destruction of a paper machine by one of a number of Special Commissions sent to East Anglia to suppress insurgent workers by the Whig Ministry.

11 January 1831 (England)
Three workers in Dorset were sentenced to death for extorting money and two workers were sentenced to death for robbery by one of the Special Commissions sent by the Whig Ministry to suppress insurgent workers.

Fifty-five workers in Norwich were convicted of "machine breaking and rioting" by one of the Special Commissions sent by the Whig Ministry to suppress insurgent workers.

Three workers in Ipswich were convicted of extorting money by one of the Special Commissions sent by the Whig Ministry to suppress insurgent workers.

In Petworth, 26 workers were found guilty of "machine breaking and rioting" by one of the Special Commissions the Whig Ministry sent by the Whig Ministry to suppress insurgent workers.

"Upwards of thirty" workers in Gloucester were convicted of "machine breaking and rioting" by one of the Special Commissions sent by the Whig Ministry to suppress insurgent workers.

Twenty-nine workers in Oxford were convicted of "machine breaking and rioting" by one of the Special Commissions sent by the Whig Ministry to suppress insurgent workers.

1832 (United States)
Boston Ship Carpenters' Ten-Hour Strike.

1833 (United States)
Lynn, Massachusetts' Shoebinders' Protest begins.

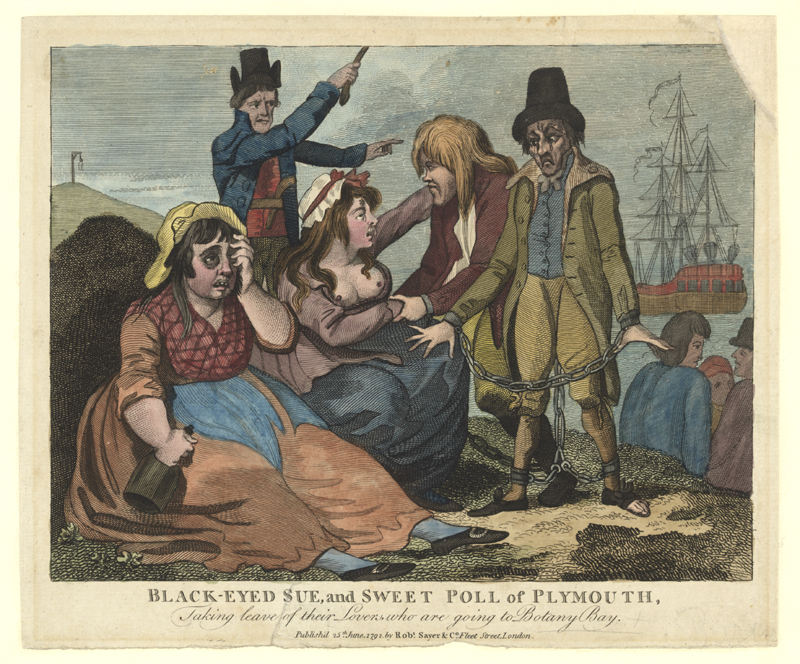
Women in England mourning their lovers who are soon to be transported to Botany Bay, 1792

1834 (England)
The Tolpuddle Martyrs, agricultural workers who formed a trade union in Tolpuddle in Dorsetshire, were sentenced by a Whig Ministry Special Commission to transportation to a penal colony in Australia.

March 1834 (United States)
National Trades' Union formed in New York when the New York General Trades' Union solicited labor organizations from around the country to send delegates to a national convention. This union was the first attempt to create a national labor federation.

1834 (United States)
Lowell, Massachusetts Mill Women's Strike.

1834 (United States)
Manayunk, Pennsylvania Textile Strike.

1835 (United States)
Carpenters, masons, and stone-cutters began a strike as part of the Ten-Hour Movement among skilled workers. They drafted a strike circular in Boston outlining their demands and seeking assistance from other tradespeople. Wherever this circular was distributed, a strike in favor of the ten-hour workday erupted. The 1835 Philadelphia general strike, in which workers successfully struck for shorter working hours and higher wages, was influenced by the Boston circular.

3 July 1835 (United States)
Textile workers, many of whom were children of Irish descent, launched the 1835 Paterson textile strike in the silk mills in Paterson, New Jersey fighting for the 11-hour day, 6 days a week.

1836 (United States)
National Cooperative Association of Cordwainers formed in New York City. This association was the first national union for a specific craft.

1836 (United States)
Lowell, Massachusetts, Mill Women's Strike.

1836 (United States)
New York City Tailors' Strike.

1836 (United States)
Philadelphia's Bookbinders' Strike.

== 1840s ==
1840 (United States)
Ten-hour day for federal employees on federal public works projects without loss of pay established by President Martin Van Buren by executive order.

1842 (United States)
Ten-hour Republican Association was formed by New England mechanics to pressure the Massachusetts legislature to establish a ten-hour workday throughout the state.

March 1842 (United States)
Commonwealth v. Hunt was a landmark legal decision by the Massachusetts Supreme Judicial Court on the subject of labor unions. Chief Justice Lemuel Shaw ruled that unions were legal organizations and had the right to organize and strike. Before this decision, labor unions which attempted to 'close' or create a unionized workplace could be charged with conspiracy. See Commonwealth v. Pullis

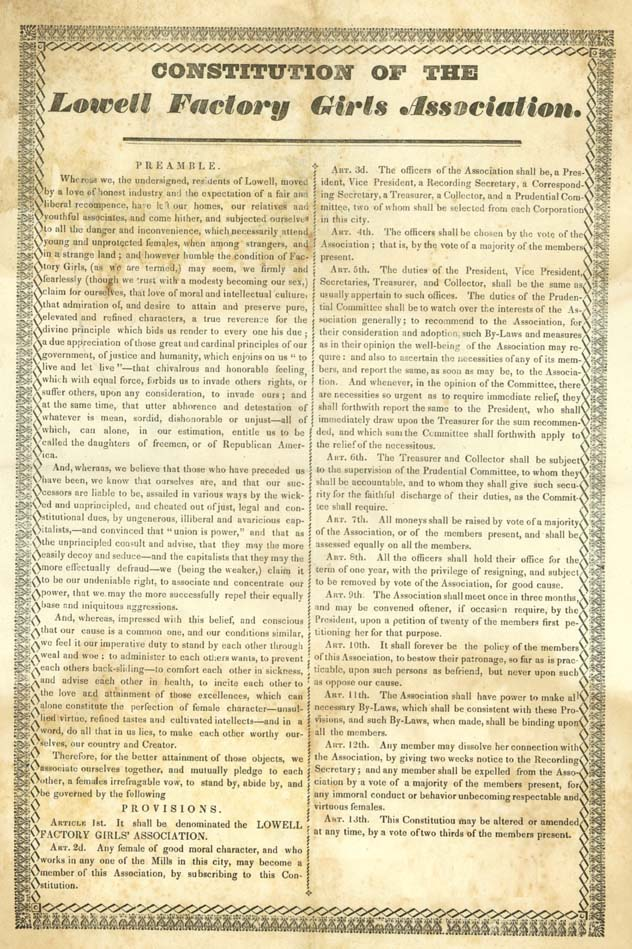
1836 Constitution of the Lowell Factory Girls Association

1844 (United States)
Lowell Female Labor Reform Association formed.

April 1844 (United States)
Fall River Mechanics' Association established 'The Mechanic', a weekly paper dedicated "to advocate the cause of the oppressed Mechanic and Laborer in all its bearings."

1847 (Scotland)
The Educational Institute of Scotland, the oldest teachers' trade union in the world, was founded.

1847 (United States)
New Hampshire is first state to establish the ten-hour workday.

1848 (United States)
Pennsylvania's child labor law establishes the age of 12 as the minimum age for workers in commercial occupations.

1848 (Germany)

Founding of the Allgemeine Deutsche Arbeiterverbrüderung (General German Workers-Brotherhood)

== 1850s ==
1850 (United States)
New York City Tailor's Strike.

13 June 1850 (United States)
American League of Colored Laborers established in New York City.

July 1851 (Australia)
Eureka Rebellion in the Colony of Victoria, Australia.

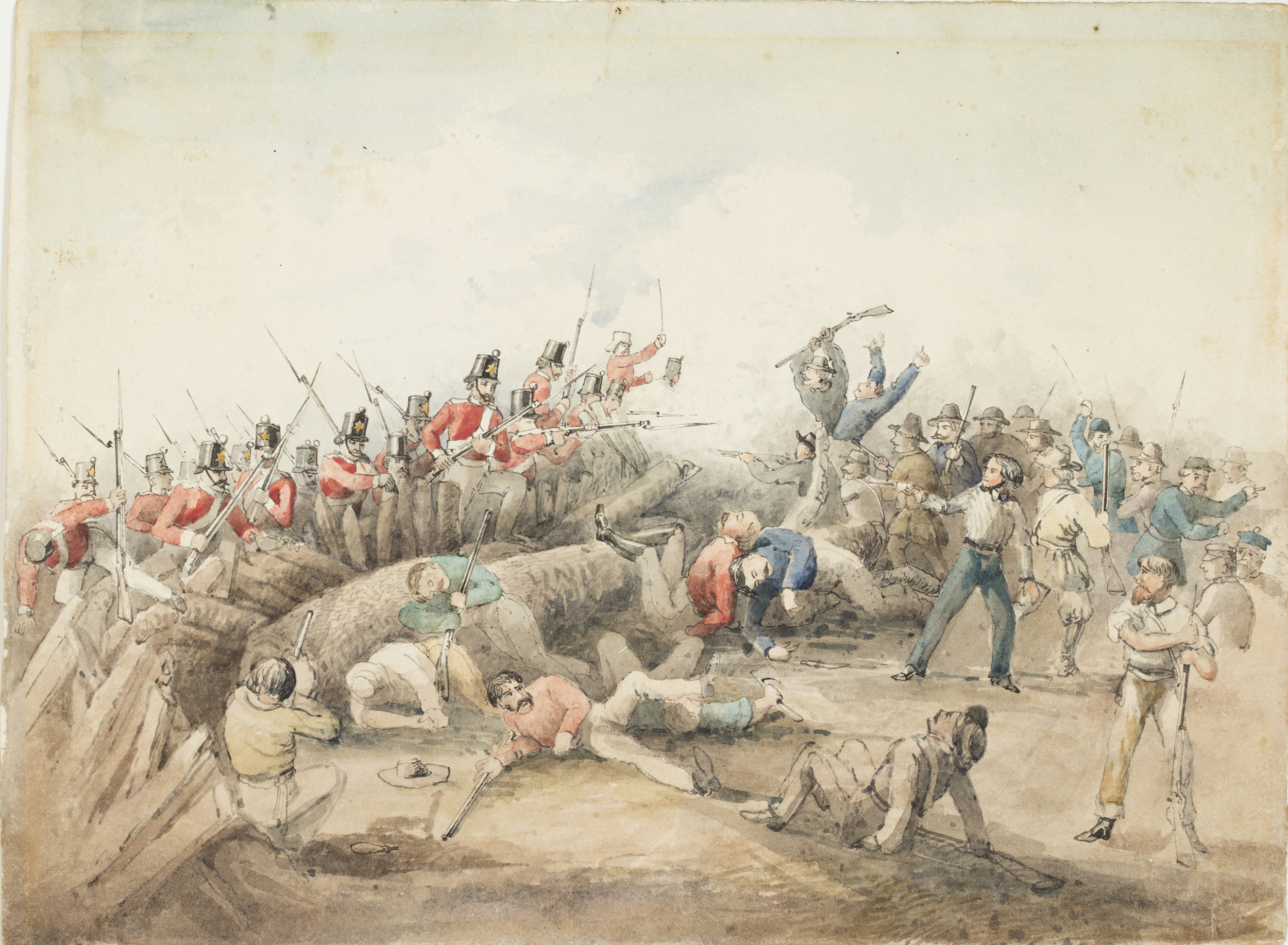
Eureka Stockade Riot by John Black Henderson (1854).

July 1851 (United States)
Two railroad strikers are shot dead and others injured by the state militia in Portage, New York.

1852 (United States)
Typographical Union founded.

21 April 1856 (Australia)
Stonemasons and building workers in Melbourne achieve an eight-hour day, the first organized workers in the world to achieve an 8-hour day, with no loss of pay.

1859 (United States)
Iron Molders' International Union founded.

== 1860s ==
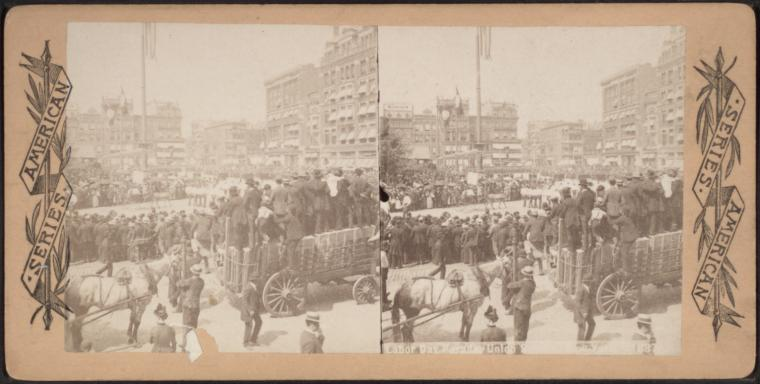
Labor Day Parade. Union St., N.Y, circa 1859–1899, from Robert N. Dennis collection of stereoscopic views

1860 (United States)

New England Shoemakers Strike of 1860

800 women operatives and 4,000 workmen marched during a shoemaker's strike in Lynn, Massachusetts.

1863 (United States)
The first railroad labor union, The Brotherhood of the Footboard (later renamed the Brotherhood of Locomotive Engineers) is formed in Marshall, Michigan. It is headed by William D. Robinson.

1864 (Europe)
International Workingmen's Association (often called the First International) is founded.

1864 (United States)
Cigar Makers' Union founded.

1864 July 21 (United States)
Operative Plasterers' and Cement Masons' International Association founded.

1866 (United States)
National Labor Union formed - 1st national labor federation in the US.

1866 (United States)
Molders' Lockout takes place.

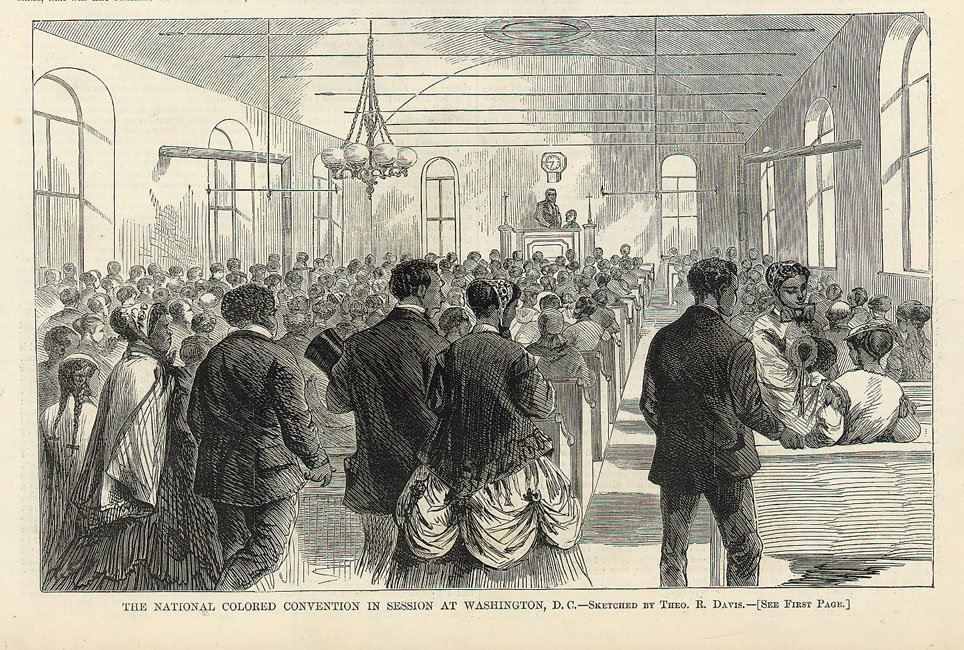
February 6, 1869 Illustration from Harper's Weekly of the Colored National Labor Union convention in Washington, D.C. Store Web page states: "from Harper's Weekly magazine with 6 × 9 [inch] wood-engraved illustration of the National Colored Convention in Session at Washington, D.C."

1867 (United States)
Order of the Knights of St. Crispin, a union for factory workers in the shoe industry, founded.

1868 (Germany)
The Allgemeiner Deutscher Gewerkschaftsbund (ADGB)(Federation of General German Civil Servants) was founded and represented 142,000 workers.

1868 (United States)
Women's Typographical Union is founded, the first labor union in the United States specifically for women

1868 (United States)
First U.S. federal eight-hour law passed. This law only applied to laborers, workmen, and mechanics employed by the U.S. federal government.

1869 (United States)
Colored National Labor Union founded.

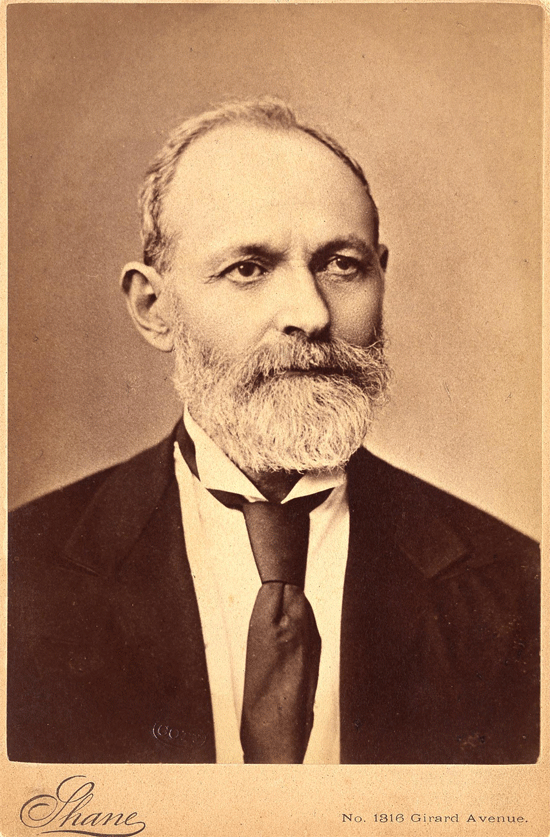
Uriah Stephens, pre-1882. Stephens (1821 - 1882) was a U.S. labor leader. He led nine Philadelphia garment workers to found the Knights of Labor in 1869, a more successful early national union.

1869 (United States)
Uriah Smith Stephens organized a new union known as the Knights of Labor.

1869 (United States)
Collar Laundry Union Strike in Troy, New York.

== 1870s ==
1870 (United States)
The first written contract between coal miners and coal miner operators signed.

1872 (Europe)
Karl Marx ejects Mikhail Bakunin and the other anarchists from the International Workingmen's Association

1873 (United States)
In 1873 the Brotherhood of Locomotive Firemen was established. In 1906 it became the Brotherhood of Locomotive Firemen & Enginemen.

13 January 1874 (United States)
The original Tompkins Square Riot occurs in New York City. As unemployed workers demonstrated in New York City's Tompkins Square Park, a detachment of mounted police charged into the crowd, beating men, women and children indiscriminately with billy clubs and leaving hundreds of casualties in their wake.

1874 (United States)
Peter M. Arthur elected Grand Chief of the Brotherhood of Locomotive Engineers. He remained in office until his death.

1875 (United States)
The Molly Maguires are convicted for the anthracite coalfield murders.

1875 (United States)
Anthracite Coal Strike takes place.

1876 (United States)
Amalgamated Association of Iron, Steel, and Tin Workers founded.

1876 (United States)
Workingmen's Party is founded. It later becomes the Socialist Labor Party.

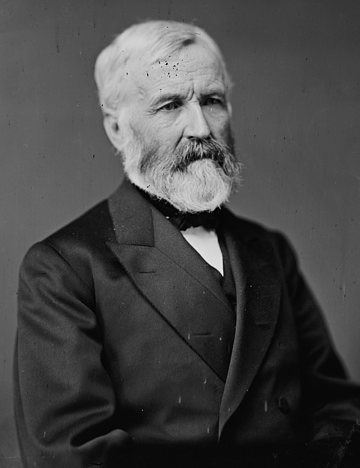
Photograph of Alexander Campbell "Father of the Greenback Party"

1876 (United States)
Greenback Party is founded.

1877 (United States)
Cigar Makers' International Union occurred.

1877 (United States)
San Francisco Anti-Chinese Riots occur.

12 February 1877 (United States)
The Great Railroad Strike of 1877 -- U.S. railroad workers began strikes to protest wage cuts. It started in Martinsburg, West Virginia, and then spread to many other states.

14 July 1877 (United States)
A general strike halted the movement of U.S. railroads. In the following days, strike riots spread across the United States. The next week, federal troops were called out to force an end to the nationwide strike. At the "Battle of the Viaduct" in the Pilsen neighborhood of Chicago, between protesting members of the Chicago German Furniture Workers Union, now Local 1784 of the Carpenters Union, and federal troops killed 30 workers and wounded over 100.

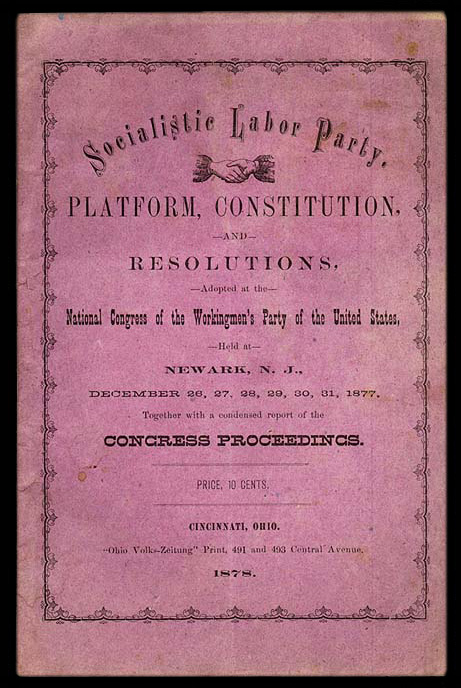
The Socialist Labor Party of America does not seem to have used its distinctive arm-and-hammer logo until it appeared on the front page of The Workmen's Advocate in 1885.

1878 (United States)
Socialist Labor Party of America founded when the Workingmen's Party of the United States voted to change its name at its December 1877 convention.

1878 (United States)
Greenback Labor Party founded.

1878 (United States)
International Labor Union founded.

== 1880s ==
1881 (United States and Canada)
Federation of Organized Trades and Labor Unions, the ender of the American Federation of Labor, was founded in the United States and Canada.

1881 (United States)
Brotherhood of Carpenters and Joiners was founded.

1881 (United States)
Revolutionary Socialist Labor Party was founded.

1882 (United States)
Cohoes, New York, Cotton Mill Strike occurred.

5 September 1882 (United States)
Thirty thousand workers marched in the first Labor Day parade in New York City.

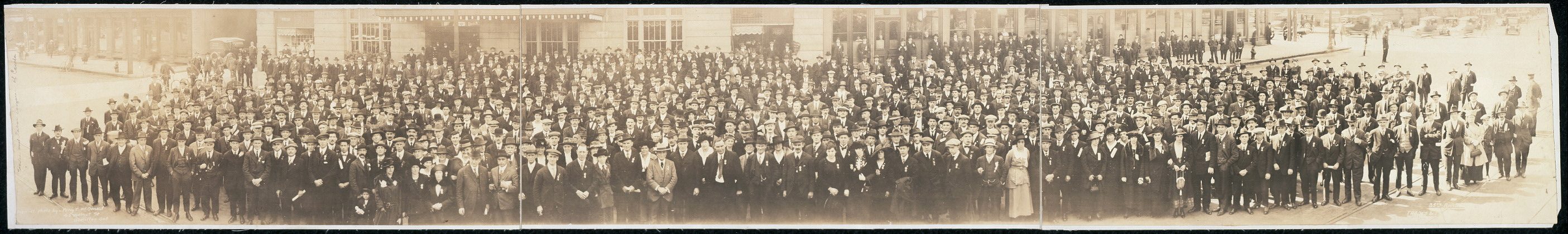
Thirty-fifth annual meeting of the Trades and Labour Congress, Hamilton, 1919.

1883 (Canada)
The Trades and Labour Congress of Canada (TLC), a Canada-wide central federation of trade unions was formed.

1883 (United States)
International Working People's Association formed.

1883 (United States)
Lynchburg, Virginia, Tobacco Workers' Strike occurred.

1883 (United States)
The Cowboy Strike of 1883 begins in the Texas panhandle, in which cowboys seek better compensation from ranch owners.

1883 (United States)
Molder's Lockout began.

1884 (United States)
The Federation of Organized Trades and Labor Unions, forerunner of the American Federation of Labor, passed a resolution stating that "8 hours shall constitute a legal day's work from and after May 1, 1886."

1884 (United States)
Federal Bureau of Labor established in the U.S. Department of the Interior.

1884 (United States)
Fall River, Massachusetts, Textile Strike occurred.

1884 (United States)
Union Pacific Railroad Strike occurred.

1885 (United States)
U.S. Congress passed the Foran Act outlawing immigration of laborers on contract.

1885 (United States)
Cloakmakers' General Strike occurred.

1885 (United States)
McCormick Harvesting Machine Company Strike occurred.

1885 (United States)
Southwest Railroad Strike occurred.

1885 (United States)
Yonkers, New York, Carpet Weaver' Strike occurred.

1885 (United States)
Ten coal-mining activists ("Molly Maguires") were hanged in Pennsylvania.

1886 (United States)
Augusta, Georgia Textile strike occurred.

1886 (United States)
Cowboy Strike occurred.

1886 (United States)
McCormick Harvesting Machine Company Strike occurred.

1886 (United States)
Troy, New York, Collar Laundresses Strike occurred.

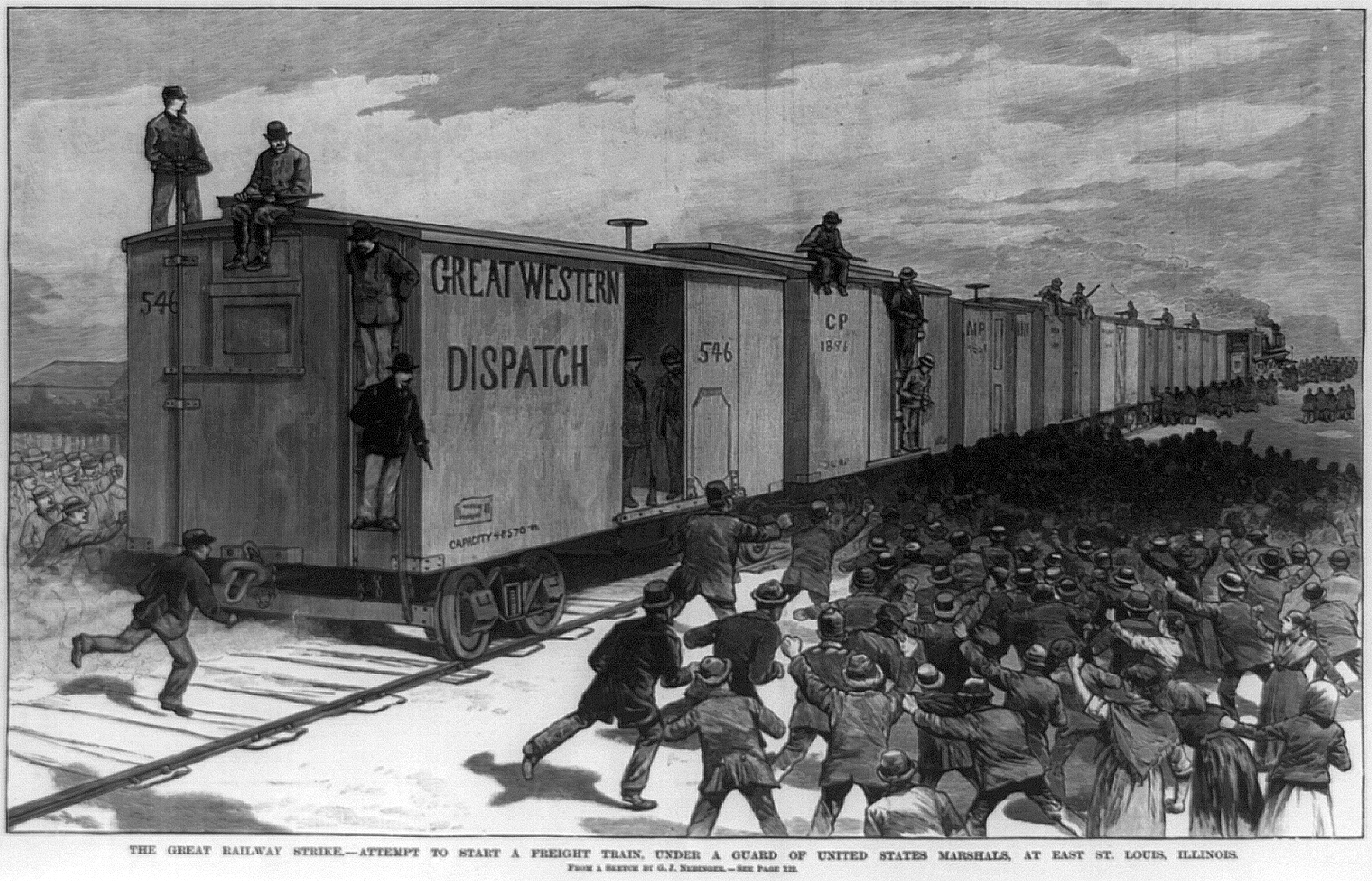
U.S. Marshals attempt to start a train during the strike in East St. Louis, Illinois.

March 1886 (United States)
The Great Southwest Railroad Strike of 1886 was a labor union strike against the Union Pacific and Missouri Pacific railroads involving more than 200,000 workers.

1 May 1886 (United States)
Workers protested in the streets to demand the universal adoption of the eight-hour day. Hundreds of thousands of American workers had joined the Knights of Labor. The movement ultimately failed.

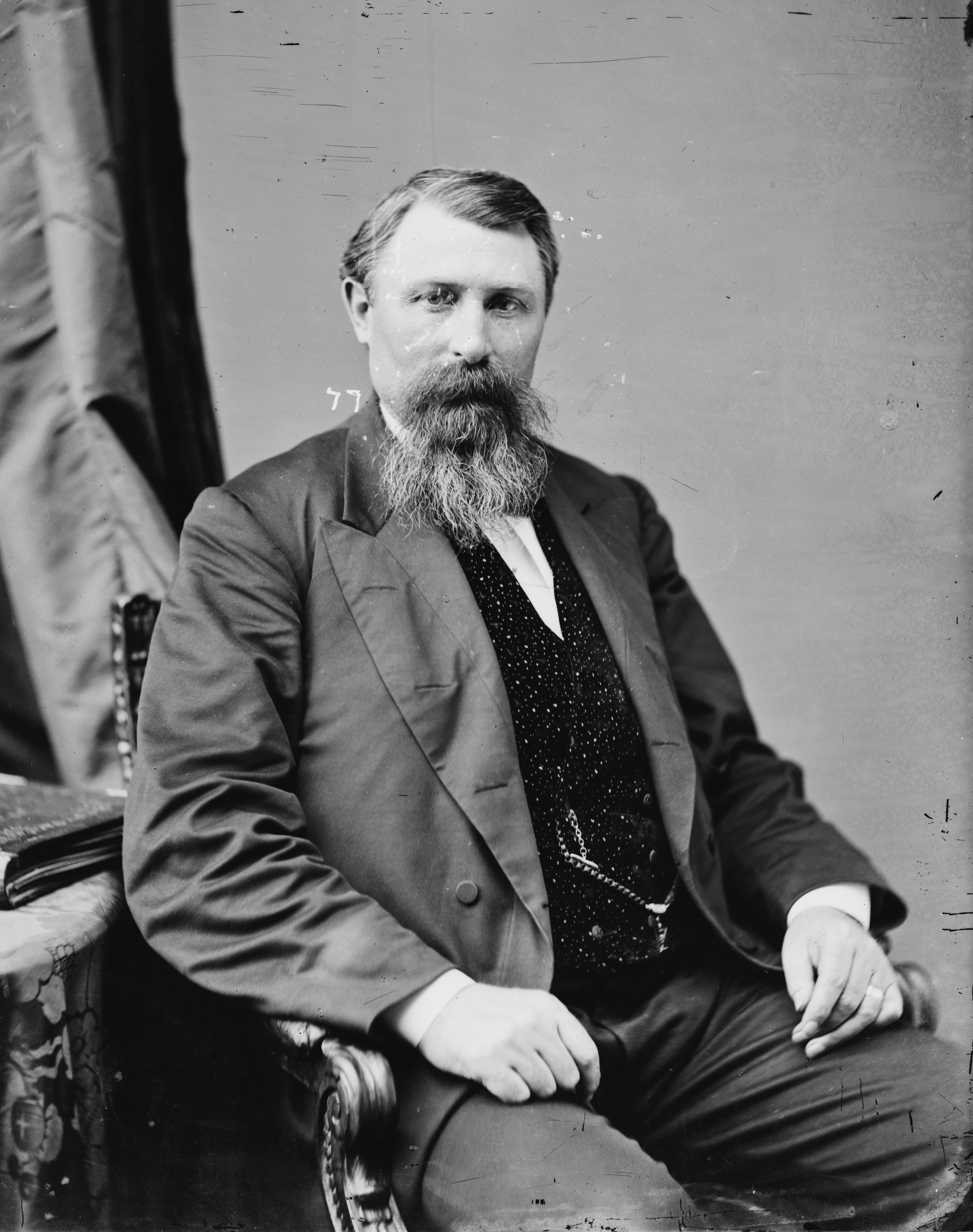
Representative Jeremiah M. Rusk

1 May 1886 (United States)
Bay View Tragedy: About 2,000 Polish workers walked off their jobs and gathered at St. Stanislaus Church in Milwaukee, Wisconsin, angrily denouncing the ten-hour workday. The protesters marched through the city, calling on other workers to join them. All but one factory was closed down as sixteen thousand protesters gathered at Rolling Mills. Wisconsin Governor Jeremiah Rusk called the state militia. The militia camped out at the mill while workers slept in nearby fields. On the morning of 5 May, as protesters chanted for the eight-hour workday, General Treaumer ordered his men to shoot into the crowd, some of whom were carrying sticks, bricks, and scythes, leaving seven dead at the scene, including a child.

The Milwaukee Journal reported that eight more would die within twenty-four hours, adding that Governor Rusk was to be commended for his quick action in the matter.

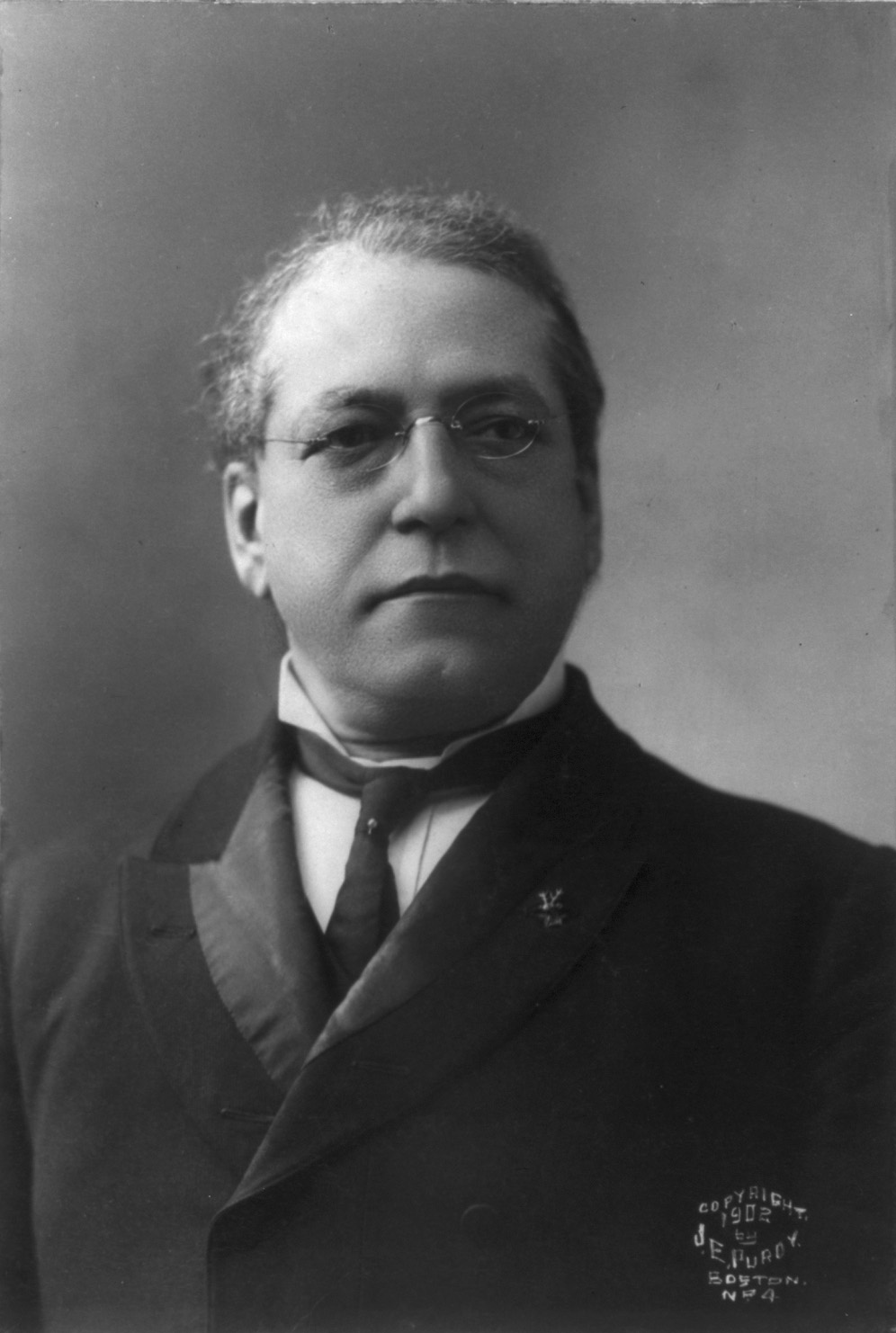
Samuel Gompers

1886 (United States)
American Federation of Labor founded. Samuel Gompers served as first president.

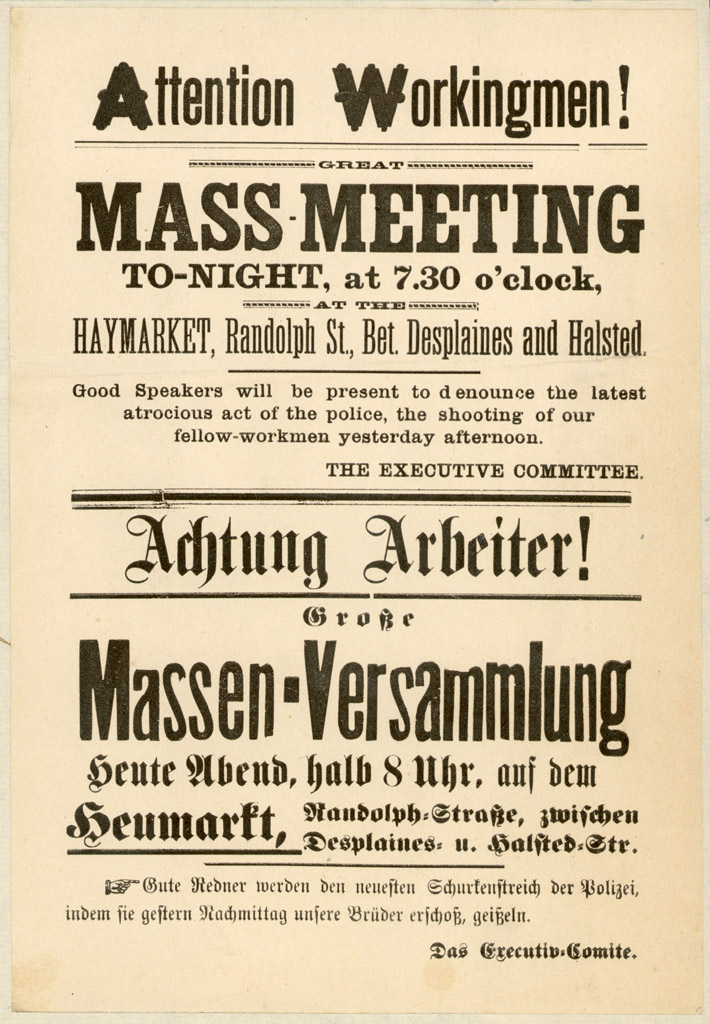
Haymarket Flier

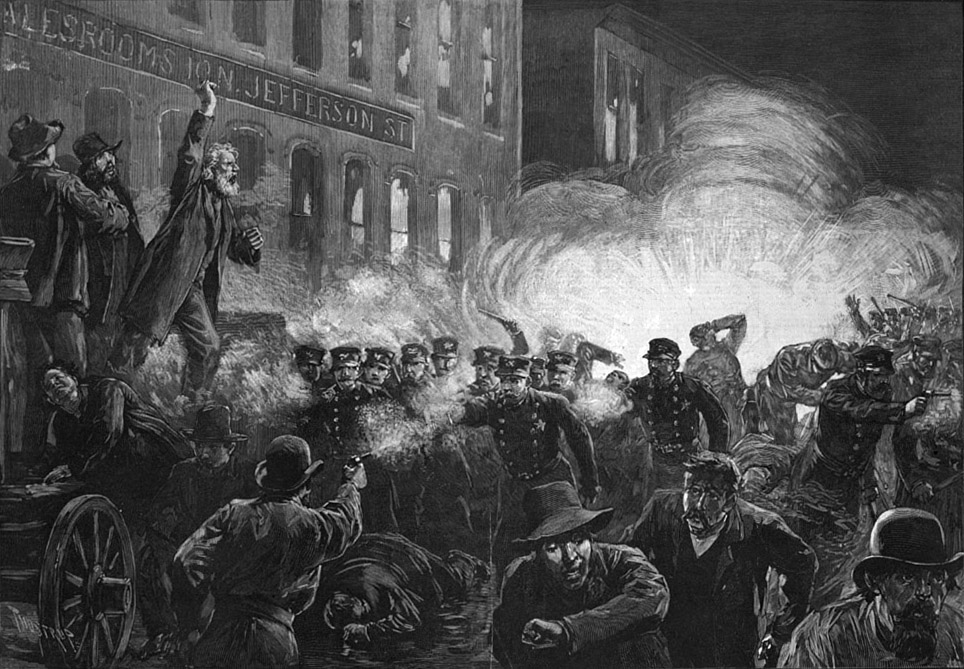
Haymarket Riot

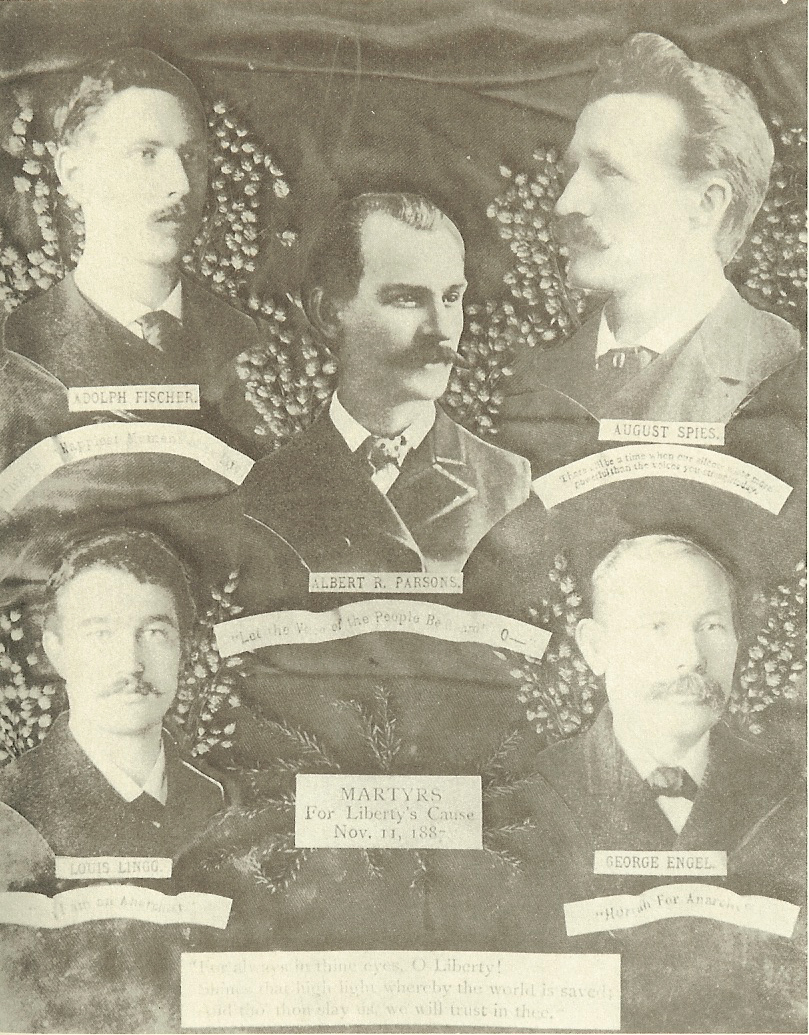
The Haymarket Martyrs

4 May 1886 (United States)
Anarchist rally lead to the Haymarket Riot in Chicago, Illinois, the origin of international May Day observances.

22 November 1887 (United States)
In the Thibodaux massacre in Thibodaux, Louisiana a local militia, aided by bands of "prominent citizens," shot at least 35 unarmed black sugar workers striking to gain a dollar-per-day wage, and lynched two strike leaders.

1887 (United States)
Seven of the Haymarket Riot bombing defendants sentenced to death, of which five are executed.

1887 (United States)
Port of New York Longshoremen's Strike occurred.

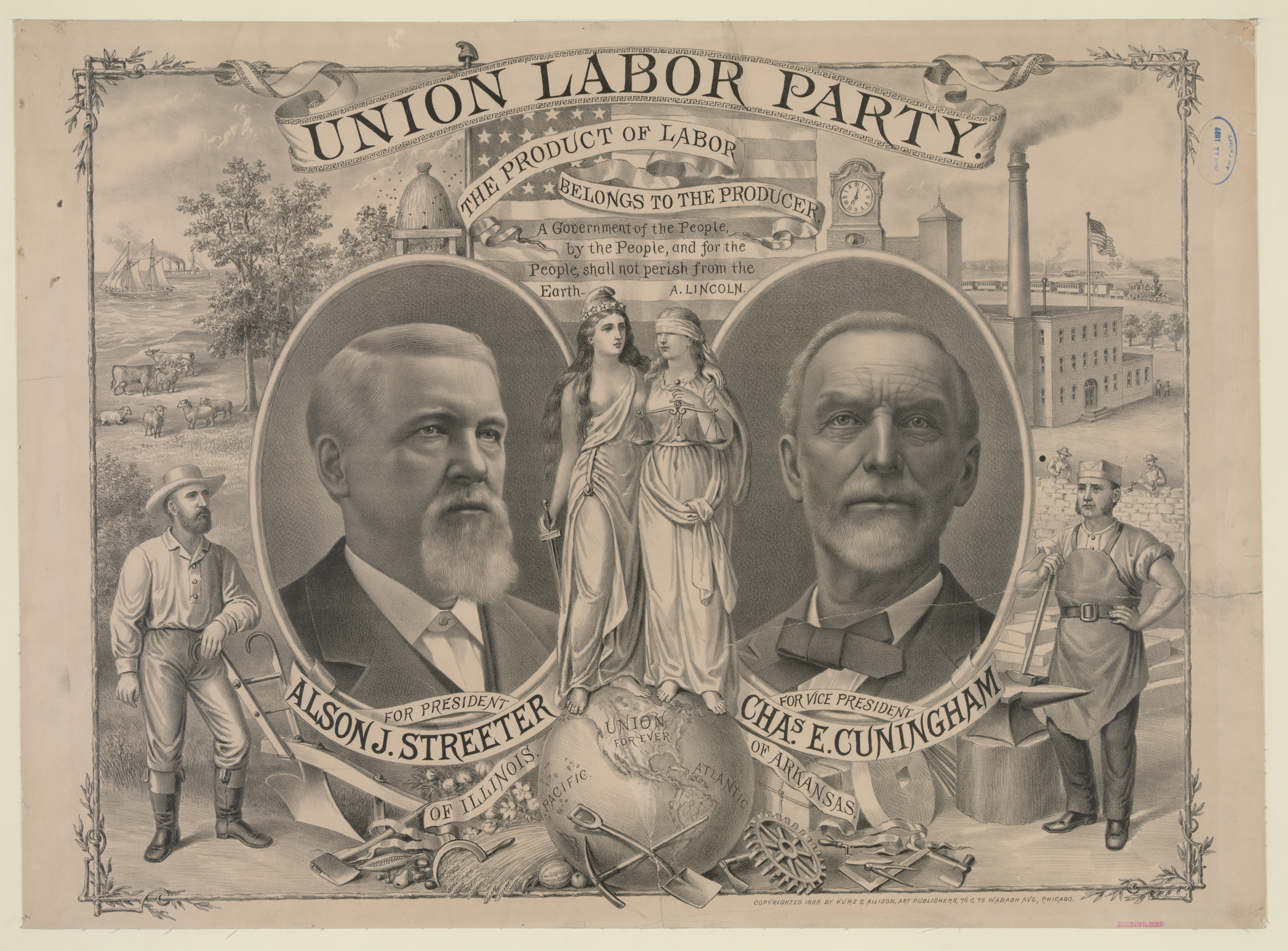
Union Labor Party campaign poster (1888)

June 1888 (United Kingdom)
The London matchgirls strike of 1888 was a strike of the women and teenage girls working at the Bryant and May Factory in Bow, London. The strike was prompted by the poor working conditions in the match factory, including fourteen-hour work days, poor pay, excessive fines, and the severe health complications of working with yellow (or white) phosphorus, such as phossy jaw.

1888 (United States)
United States enacted first federal labor relations law; the law applied only to railroads.

1888 (United States)
International Association of Machinists founded.

1888 (United States)
Burlington Railroad Strike occurred.

1888 (United States)
Cincinnati Shoemakers' Lockout occurred.

1889 (United States)
Baseball Players' Revolt began.

1889 (United States)
Fall River, Massachusetts, Textile Strike occurred.

1889 (Europe)
The Second International is founded. Declaration of 1 May as International Workers' Day.

== 1890s ==
1890 (United States)
United Mine Workers of America founded.

1890 (United States)
United Brotherhood of Carpenters and Joiners of America Strike occurred; the union demanded an eight-hour work day.

25 July 1890 (United States)
New York garment workers won the right to unionize after a seven-month strike. They secured agreements for a closed shop, and firing of all strikebreakers.

1891 (United States)
Savannah, Georgia, Black Labourers' Strike occurred.

1891 (United States)
Tennessee Miners' Strike occurred.

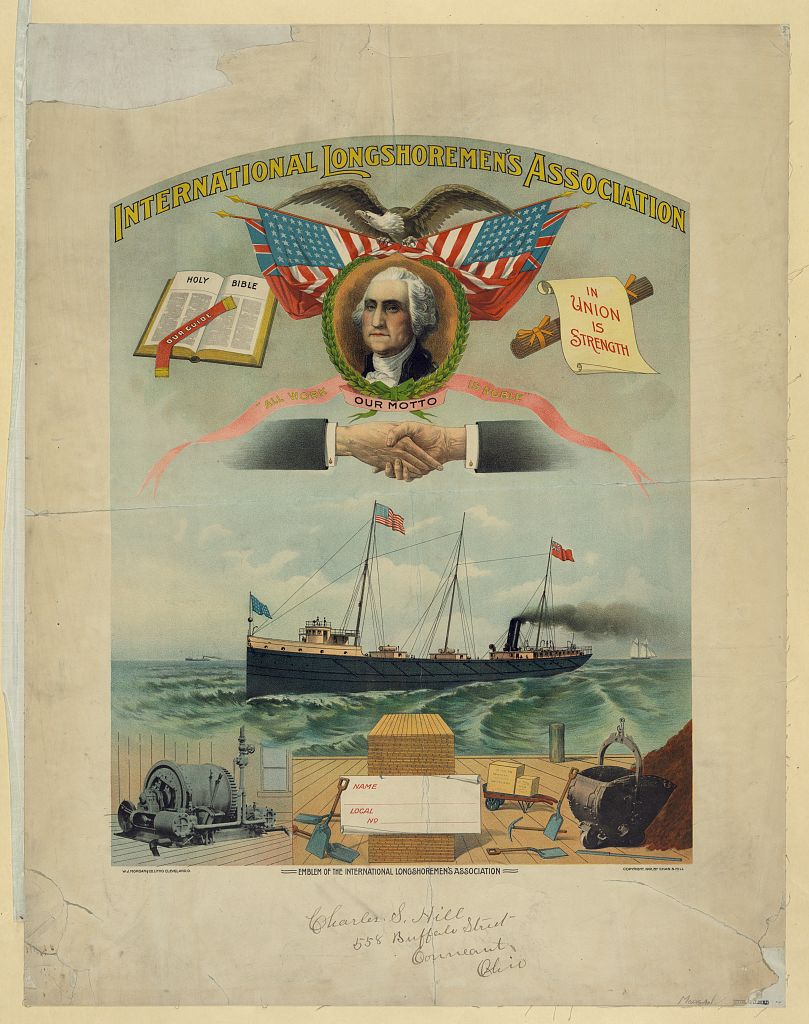
International Longshoremen's Union banner

1892 (United States)
International Longshoremen's Association founded.

1892 (United States)
International Seamen's Union founded.

1892 (United States)
New Orleans General Strike occurred.

6 July 1892 (United States)
Homestead Strike: Pinkerton Guards, trying to pave the way for the introduction of strikebreakers, opened fire on striking Carnegie mill steel-workers in Homestead, Pennsylvania. In the ensuing battle, three Pinkertons surrendered and were set upon and beaten by a mob of townspeople, most of them women. Seven guards and eleven strikers and spectators were shot to death.

11 July 1892 (United States)
Coeur d'Alene, Idaho labor strike of 1892: Striking miners in Coeur d'Alene, Idaho dynamited the Frisco Mill, leaving it in ruins.

August 1892 (United States)
Buffalo Switchmen's Strike collapses after two weeks when 8,000 New York State militia enter the city and peer unions fail to come to the strikers' aid.

1893 (United States)
American Railway Union founded.

1893 (United States)
Western Federation of Miners founded.

1893 (United States)
Federal court in Louisiana rules that the Sherman Antitrust Act applies to unions and finds that sympathy strikes restrain trade.

1893 (United States)
National Civic Federation founded.

1893 (United States)
Unions helped win the passage of the Safety Appliance Act. Among other things, the Act outlawed the "old man-killer link and pin coupler" by railroads.

1894 (United Kingdom)
History of Trade Unionism, the influential book by Sidney and Beatrice Webb is first published.

1894 (United States)
Coxey's Army marched on Washington, D.C.

7 February 1894 (United States)
In Cripple Creek, Colorado, miners went on strike when mine owners announced an increase from eight to ten hours per day, with no increase in wages. This strike marked perhaps the only time in American history that a state militia was called out to protect miners from sheriff's deputies.

21 April – June 1894 (United States)
Bituminous Coal Miners' Strike of 1894 -- A two-month nationwide strike by miners of hard coal in the United States. This unsuccessful strike almost destroyed the United Mine Workers union.

Pullman strikers outside Arcade Building in Pullman, Chicago. The Illinois National Guard can be seen guarding the building during the Pullman Railroad Strike in 1894.

11 May – 10 July 1894 (United States)
Pullman Strike: A nation-wide strike against the Pullman Company begins with a wildcat walkout on 11 May after wages are drastically reduced. On 5 July, the 1892 World's Columbian Exposition in Chicago's Jackson Park was set ablaze, and seven buildings were burned to the ground. The mobs burned and looted railroad cars and fought police in the streets, until 10 July, when 14,000 federal and state troops finally succeeded in putting down the strike, killing 34 American Railway Union members. Leaders of the strike, including Eugene Debs, were imprisoned for violating injunctions, causing disintegration of the union.

1895 (France)
The Confédération Générale du Travail (CGT), was formed. This French union is the oldest confederation still in existence.

April 1895 (United States)
American Industrial Union established by former American Railway Union Vice President George W. Howard. The union proves to be short-lived, disappearing in the second half of 1896.

June 1895 (United States)
U.S. Supreme Court rules in In re Debs to uphold an injunction against the Pullman Strikers on the grounds that the federal government is empowered to regulate interstate commerce.

1895 (United States)
Socialist Trade and Labor Alliance founded.

1895 (United States)
Haverhill, Massachusetts, Show Strike occurred.

21 September 1896 (United States)
The state militia was sent to Leadville, Colorado to break a miner's strike.

Lattimer massacre: Mine workers began their protest march near Harwood and many were eventually killed by the Luzerne County sheriff in Lattimer.

10 September 1897 (United States)
Lattimer massacre: 19 unarmed striking coal miners and mine workers were killed and 36 wounded by a posse organized by the Luzerne County sheriff for refusing to disperse near Hazleton, Pennsylvania. The strikers, most of whom were shot in the back, were originally brought in as strike-breakers, but later organized themselves.

1898 (United States)
The Erdman Act was passed providing for mediation and voluntary arbitration on the railroads. It made it a criminal offense for railroads to dismiss employees or to discriminate against prospective employees because of their union membership or activity. It provided legal protection of employees' rights to membership in a labor union, a limit on the use of injunctions in labor disputes, lawful status of picketing and other union activities, and requirement of employers to bargain collectively. Subsequently, a portion of the Erdman Act, which would have made it a criminal offense for railroads to dismiss employees or discriminate against prospective employees based on their union activities, was declared invalid by the United States Supreme Court.

1898 (United States)
American Labor Union founded.

1898 (United States)
Marlboro, Massachusetts, Shoe Workers' Strike began.

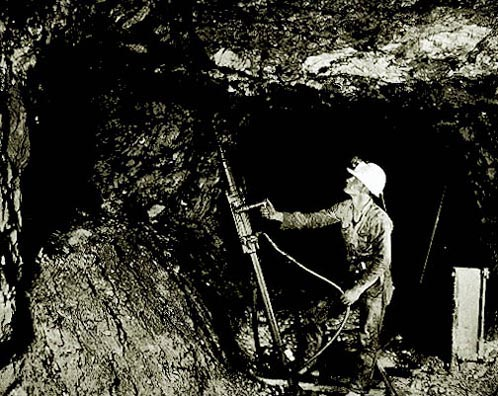
Miner extracting ore from Bunker Hill mine

1899 (United States)
Miners in Idaho dynamite a mill in retaliation for the Bunker Hill Mining Company firing 17 union members.

1899 (United States)
Brotherhood of Teamsters founded.

1899 (United States)
Buffalo, New York, Grain Shoveler's Strike occurred.

1899 (United States)
Cleveland, Ohio, Street Railway Worker's Strike occurred.

1899 (United States)
Newsboys Strike of 1899 occurred in New York City.

== 1900s ==
1900 (United States)
International Ladies' Garment Workers Union founded.

1900 (United States)
Anthracite Coal Strike occurred.

1900 (United States)
Machinists' Strike occurred.

1901 (United States)
United Textile Workers founded.

1901 (United States)
Machinists' Strike occurred.

1901 (United States)
National Cash Register Strike occurred.

1901 (United States)
San Francisco Restaurant Workers' Strike occurred.

1901 (United States)
U.S. Steel Recognition Strike of 1901 occurred.

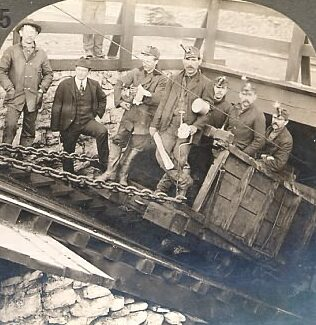
Coal miners in Hazleton, Pennsylvania, 1902

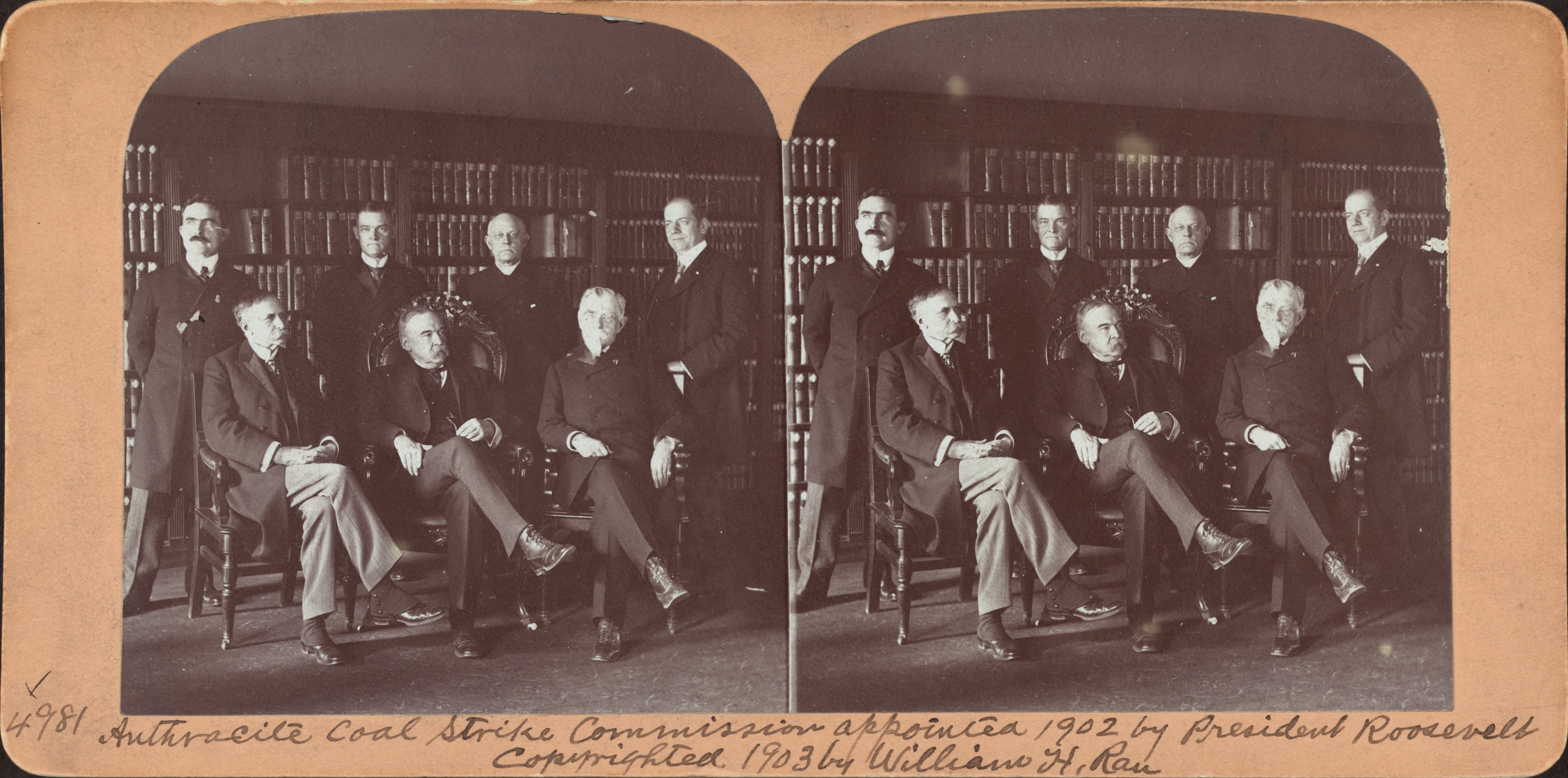
Anthracite Coal Strike Commission Appointed 1902 by President Roosevelt, a stereo card of the commission appointed by Theodore Roosevelt to resolve the Coal Strike of 1902.

15 May 1902 (United States)
Coal Strike of 1902 -- United Mine Workers of America in the anthracite coal fields of eastern Pennsylvania struck in seven counties, from May through October. The strike caused a nationwide coal shortage. President Theodore Roosevelt imposed the first mediated agreement of its kind.

1902 (United States)
Chicago Teamsters' Strike occurred.

1903 (United States)
U.S. Department of Commerce and Labor created.

1903 (United States)
Women's Trade Union League founded.

1903 (United States)
Oxnard, California, Sugar Beet Strike occurred.

1903 (United States)
Carbon County Strike began.

23 November 1903 (United States)
Colorado Labor Wars: Troops were dispatched to Cripple Creek, Colorado to defeat a strike by the Western Federation of Miners, with the specific purpose of driving the union out of the district. The strike had begun in the ore mills earlier in 1903, and then spread to the mines.

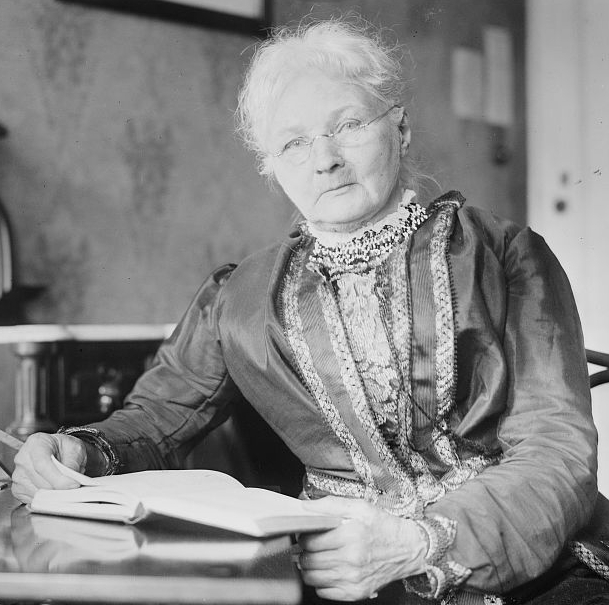
American labor activist Mother Jones (1837–1930)

July 1903 (United States)
Labor organizer Mary Harris "Mother" Jones leads child workers in demanding a 55-hour work week.

1904 (United States)
New York City Interborough Rapid Transit Strike.

1904 (United States)
United Packinghouse Workers of America.

1904 (United States)
Santa Fe Railroad Shopmen's Strike.

8 June 1904 (United States)
A battle between the Colorado Militia and striking miners at Dunnville ended with six union members dead and 15 taken prisoner. Seventy-nine of the strikers were deported to Kansas two days later.

1905 (United States)
Industrial Workers of the World founded in Chicago, Illinois.

17 April 1905 (United States)
The Supreme Court held in Lochner v. New York that a maximum hours law for New York bakery workers was unconstitutional under the due process clause of the 14th amendment.

1906 (United States)
An eight-hour workday is widely adopted in the printing industry.

1907 (United States)
Goldfield, Nevada, Miners' Strike began.

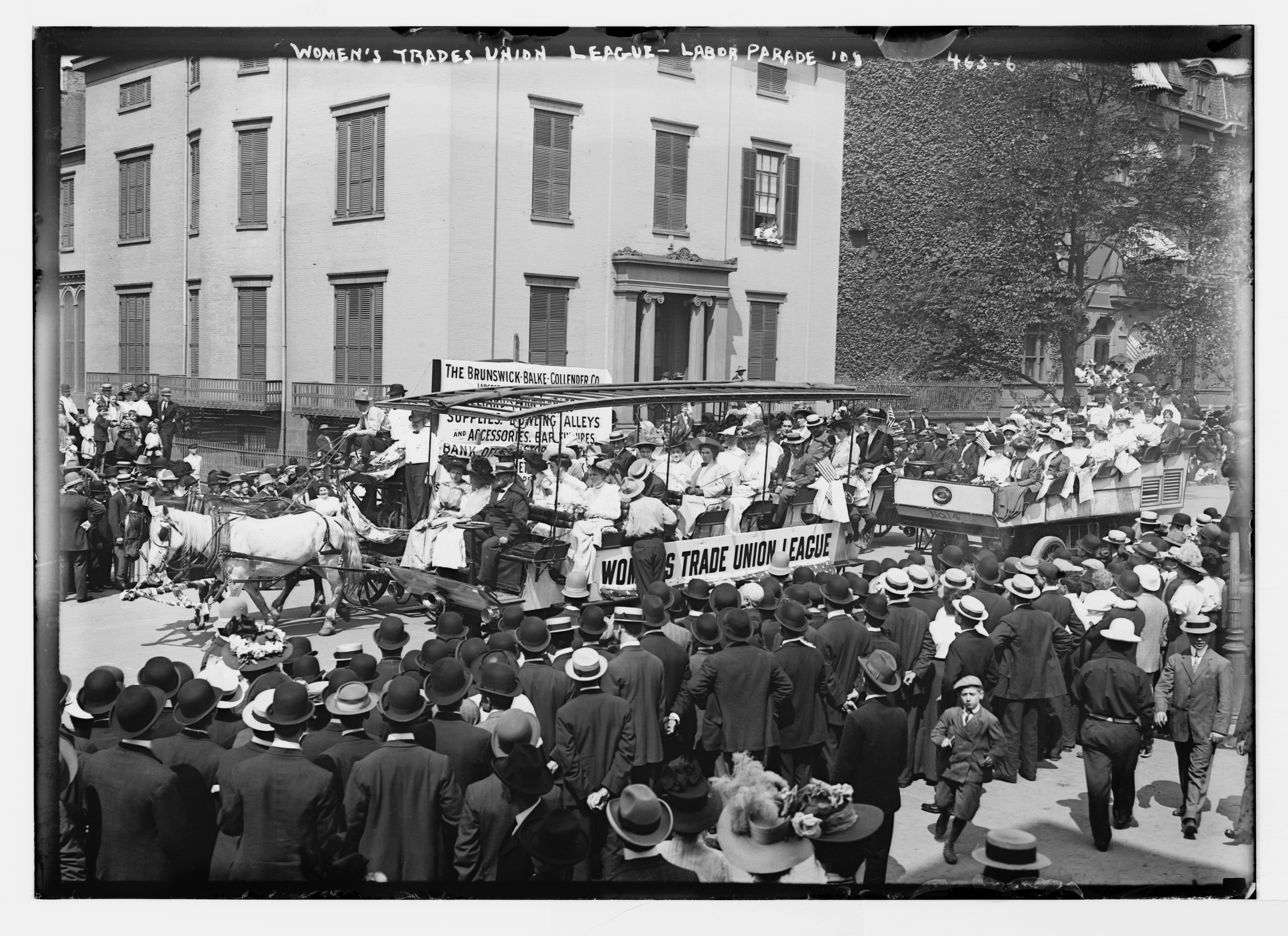
Labor Day Parade, float of Women's Trade Union League, New York, 1908 September 7

1908 (United States)
The Federal Employers' Liability Act was passed. Also that year, the Erdman Act was further weakened by the Supreme Court when Section 10, related to use of "yellow dog" contracts, was declared unconstitutional (see 1898).

1908 (United States)
U.S. Supreme Court rules in Danbury Hatters Case that a boycott launched by the United Hatters Union is a conspiracy in restraint of trade under the Sherman Antitrust Act.

1908 (United States)
U.S. Supreme Court rules in Muller vs. Oregon that an Oregon law that limited the working hours for women was unconstitutional.

1908 (United States)
IWW Free Speech Fight began in Missoula, Montana.

1909 (United States)
National Association for the Advancement of Colored People founded.

1909 (United States)
IWW Free Speech Fight began in Spokane, Washington.

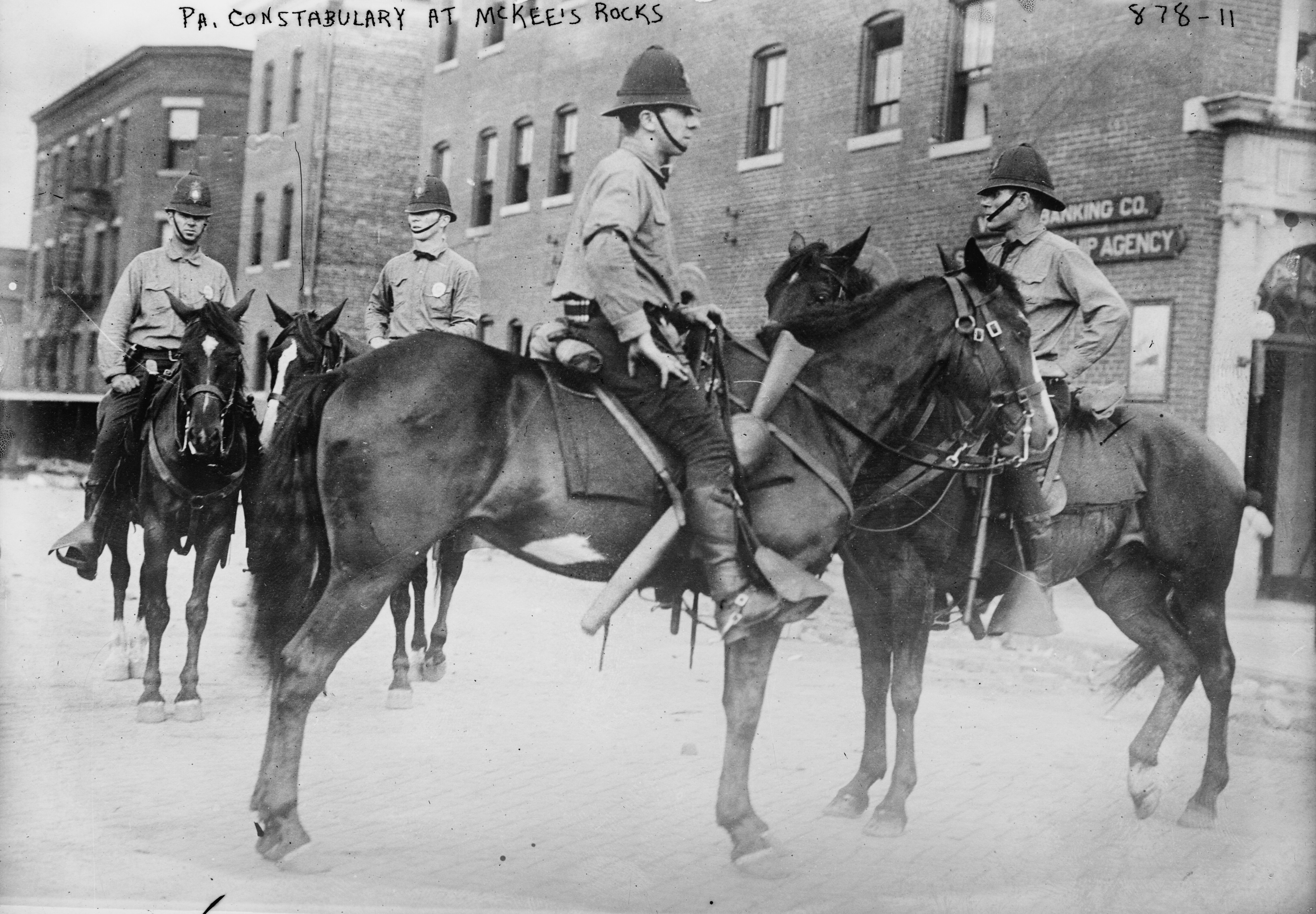
Pennsylvania constabulary, mounted on horses, at McKee's Rock, c. 1909

1909 (United States)
McKees Rocks, Pennsylvania, Steel Strike began.

1909 (United States)
Watertown, Connecticut, Arsenal Strike occurred.

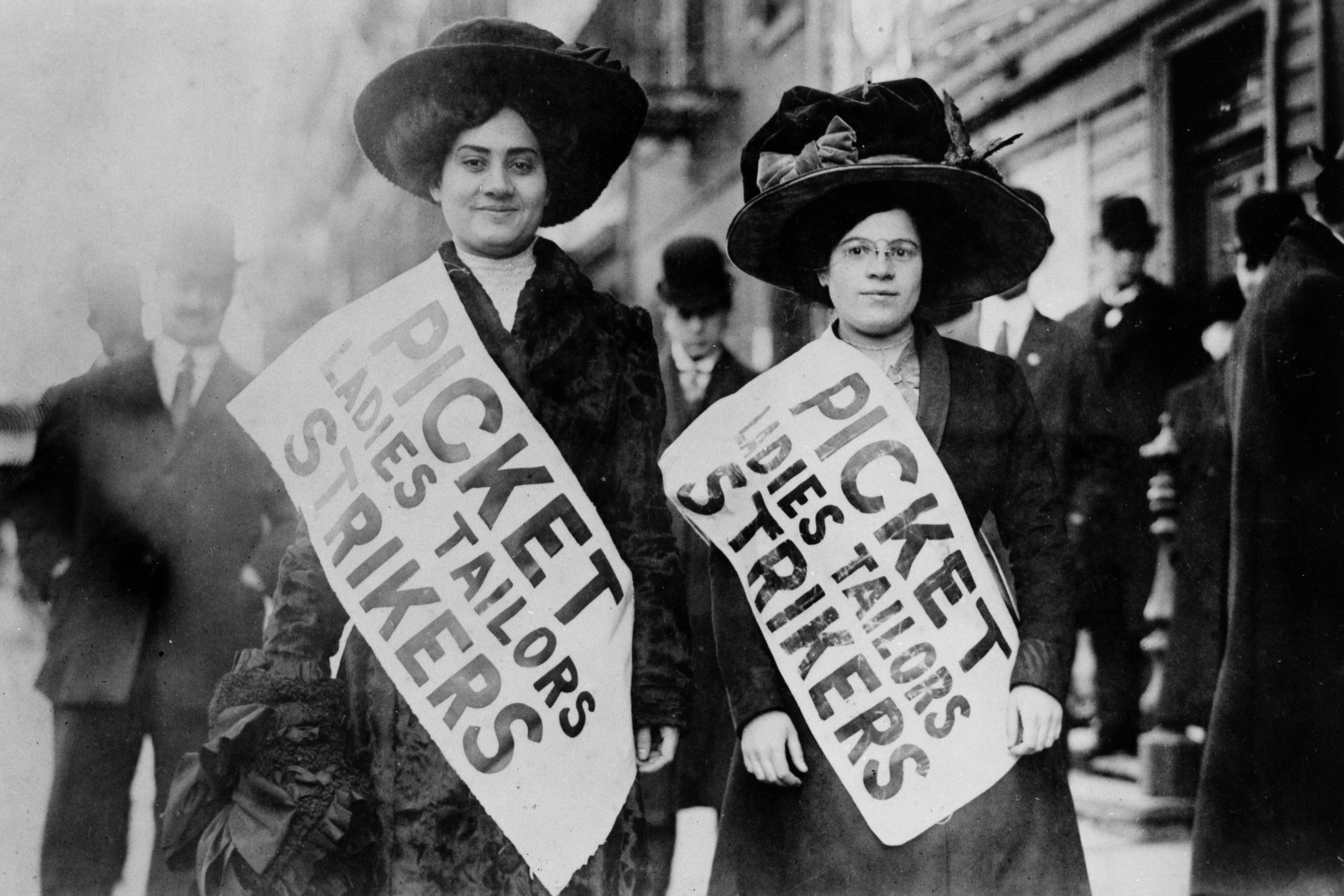
Two women strikers on picket line during the "Uprising of the 20,000", garment workers strike, New York City. Strikes, ladies tailors, N.Y., Feb. 1910, picket girls on duty

22 November 1909 (United States)
The New York shirtwaist strike of 1909 (Uprising of the 20,000) began. Female garment workers went on strike in New York; many were arrested. A judge told those arrested: "You are on strike against God".

== 1910s ==
1910 (United States)
Bethlehem Steel Strike occurred.

1910 (United States)
Cloakmakers' Strike occurred.

1910 (United States)
Chicago Clothing Workers' Strike occurred.

1910 (United States)
The 1910 Accident Reports Act was passed and a 10-hour work day and standardization of rates of pay and working conditions were won by the Railway Brotherhoods.

Union membership topped 8 million workers in 1910.

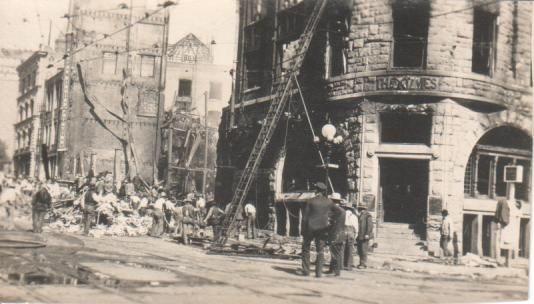
Rubble of the Los Angeles Times building in 1910

1 October 1910 (United States)
The Los Angeles Times bombing killed twenty people and destroyed the building. Calling it "the crime of the century," the newspaper's owner Harrison Gray Otis blamed the bombing on the unions, a charge denied by unionists.

1 November 1910 (Spain)
The Confederación Nacional del Trabajo was founded.

25 December 1910 (United States)

A dynamite bomb destroyed a portion of the Llewellyn Iron works in Los Angeles, where a strike was in progress. In April 1911 James B. McNamara and his older brother John F. McNamara, secretary-treasurer of the International Association of Bridge and Structural Iron Workers, were charged with the two crimes. James McNamara pleaded guilty to murder and John McNamara pleaded guilty to conspiracy in the dynamiting of the Llewellyn Iron Works.

1911 (United States)
The Locomotive Inspection Act passed. Four years later, the Hours of Service Act passed. The Railroad Brotherhoods had won an eight-hour day.

The Supreme Court in Gompers v. Buck's Stove and Range Co. (221 U.S. 418) affirmed a lower court order for the AFL to stop interfering with Buck's Stove and Range Company's business or boycotting its products or distributors.

On 24 June 1912 in the second contempt trial, the defendants (Samuel Gompers, John Mitchell, and Frank Morrison) were again found guilty and sentenced to prison. The Supreme Court overturned the convictions because the new proceedings had not been instituted within the three-year statute of limitations (233 U.S. 604 1914).

1911 (United States)
Illinois Central and Harriman Line Rail Strike occurred.

1911 (United States)
Southern Lumber Operators' Lockout began.

1911 (Wales)
Two men are shot dead by police during the Llanelli railway strike of August 1911, leading to rioting.

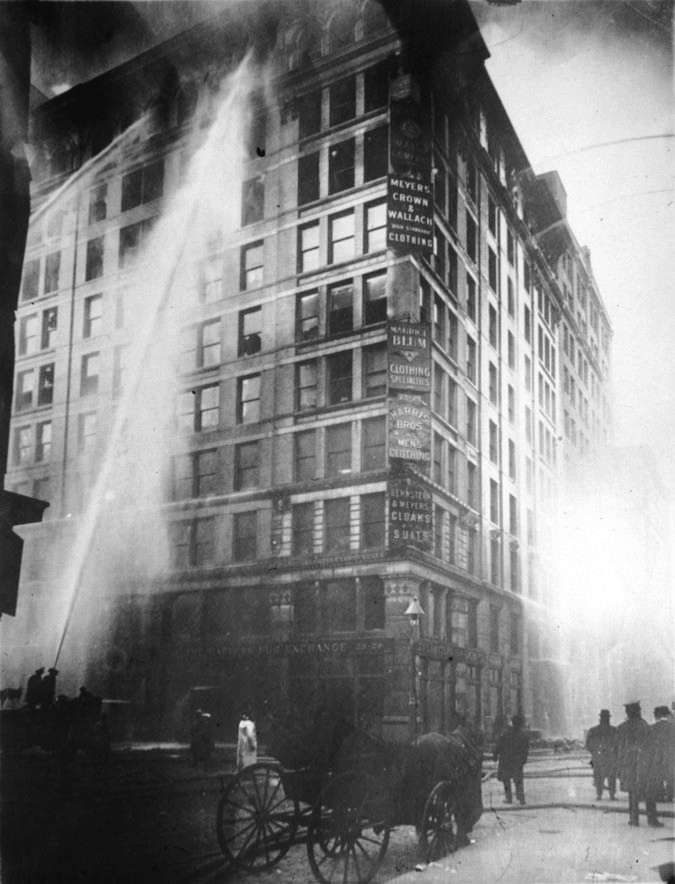
Image of Triangle Shirtwaist Factory fire on 25 March 1911

25 March 1911 (United States)
Triangle Shirtwaist Factory fire -- The Triangle Shirtwaist Company, occupying the top three floors of a ten-story building in New York City, was consumed by fire. One hundred and forty-six people, mostly women and young girls working in sweatshop conditions, died.

1912 (United States)
Massachusetts passes the first minimum wage law for women and minors.

1912 (United States)
Chicago newspaper strike occurred.

1912 (United States)
Fur Workers' Strike occurred.

1912 (United States)
IWW Free Speech Fight occurred in San Diego, California.

1912 (United States)
New York City Hotel Strike occurred.

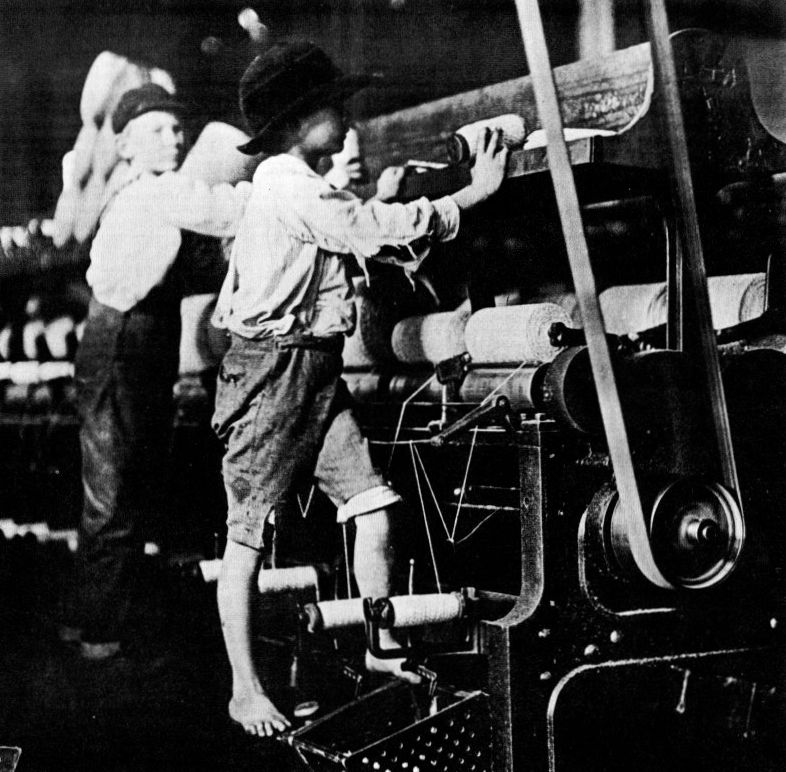
Lawrence Textile Strike, 1912

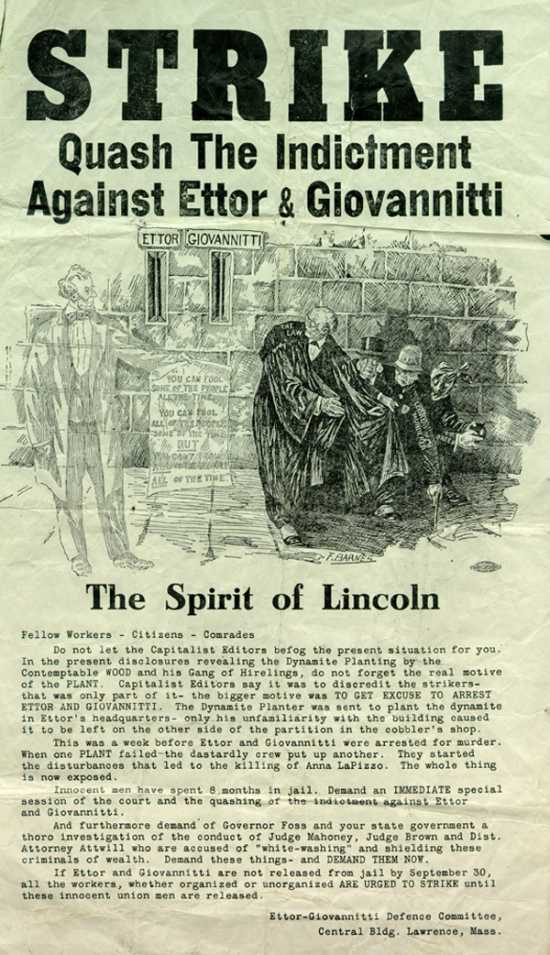
Flyer distributed in Lawrence, September 1912. The Lawrence Textile Strike was a strike of immigrant workers in Lawrence, Massachusetts in 1912 led by the Industrial Workers of the World.

January–March 1912 (United States)
Lawrence Textile Strike in Lawrence, Massachusetts, often known as the "Bread and Roses" Strike. Dozens of different immigrant communities united under the leadership of the Industrial Workers of the World (IWW) in a largely successful strike led to a large extent by women. The strike is credited with inventing the moving picket line, a tactic devised to keep strikers from being arrested for loitering.

It also adopted a tactic used before in Europe, but never in the United States, of sending children to sympathizers in other cities when they could not be cared for by strike funds. On 24 February, women attempting to put their children on a train out of town were beaten by police, shocking the nation.

18 April 1912 (United States)
The National Guard was called out against striking West Virginia coal miners at the Paint Creek and Cabin Creek, West Virginia mines.

7 July 1912 (United States)
Striking members of the Brotherhood of Timber Workers and supporters are involved in an armed confrontation with the Galloway Lumber Company and supporters in the Grabow Riot, resulting in four deaths and 40 to 50 wounded.

1913 (United States)
U.S. Department of Labor established.

1913 (United States)
Machinists Strike and Boycott

1913 (United States)
Michigan Copper Strike

1913 (United States)
Paterson, New Jersey, Textile Strike

1913 (United States)
Rubber Workers' Strike

1913 (United States)
Studebaker Motors Auto Workers' Strike

1913 (United States)
Wheatland, California, Hop Riot

11 June 1913 (United States)
Police shot into a crowd of maritime workers (two of whom was killed) who were striking against the United Fruit Company in New Orleans.

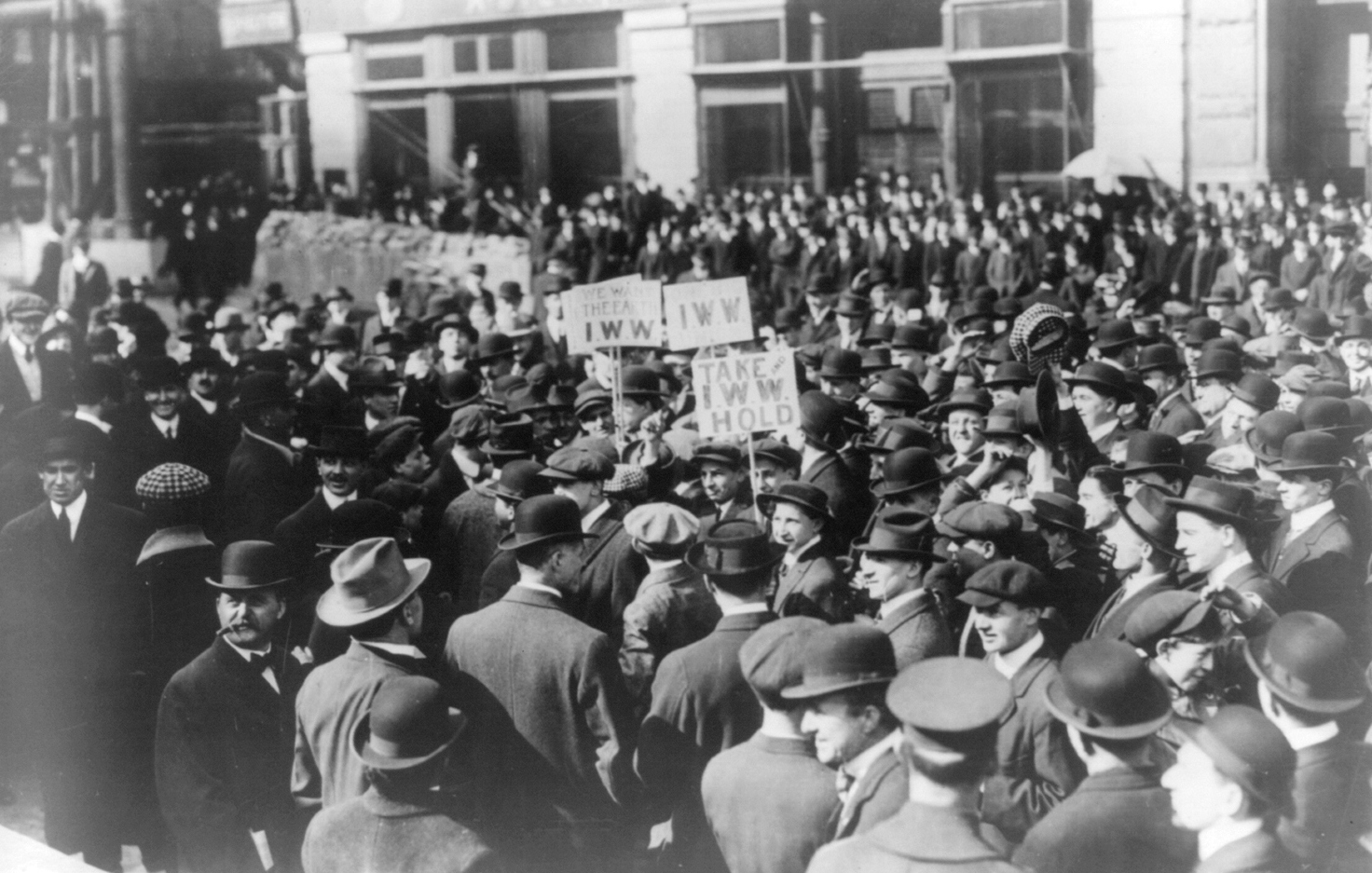
Industrial Workers of the World (IWW) demonstration in New York, 11 April 1914

1914 (United States)
According to a report by the Commission on Industrial Relations, approximately 35,000 workers were killed in industrial accidents and 700,000 workers were injured in the U.S.

1914 (United States)
U.S. Congress passes the Clayton Antitrust Act limiting the use of injunctions in labor disputes.

1914 (United States)
Amalgamated Clothing Workers founded.

1914 (United States)
Fulton Bag and Cotton Mill Strike occurred.

5 January 1914 (United States)
The Ford Motor Company raised its basic wage from $2.40 for a nine-hour day to $5 for an eight-hour day.

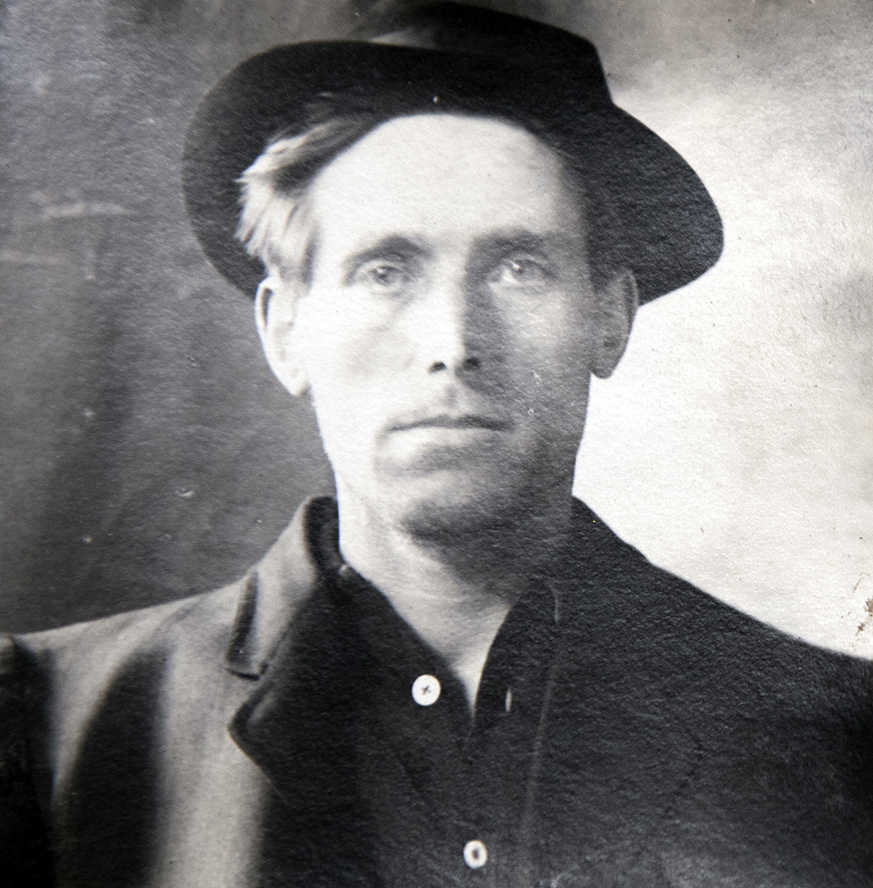
Joe Hill

14 January 1914 (United States)
Labor leader Joe Hill was arrested in Salt Lake City, Utah. He was convicted on murder charges, and was executed 21 months later despite worldwide protests and two attempts to intervene by President Woodrow Wilson. In a letter to Bill Haywood shortly before his death he penned the famous words, "Don't mourn - organize!"

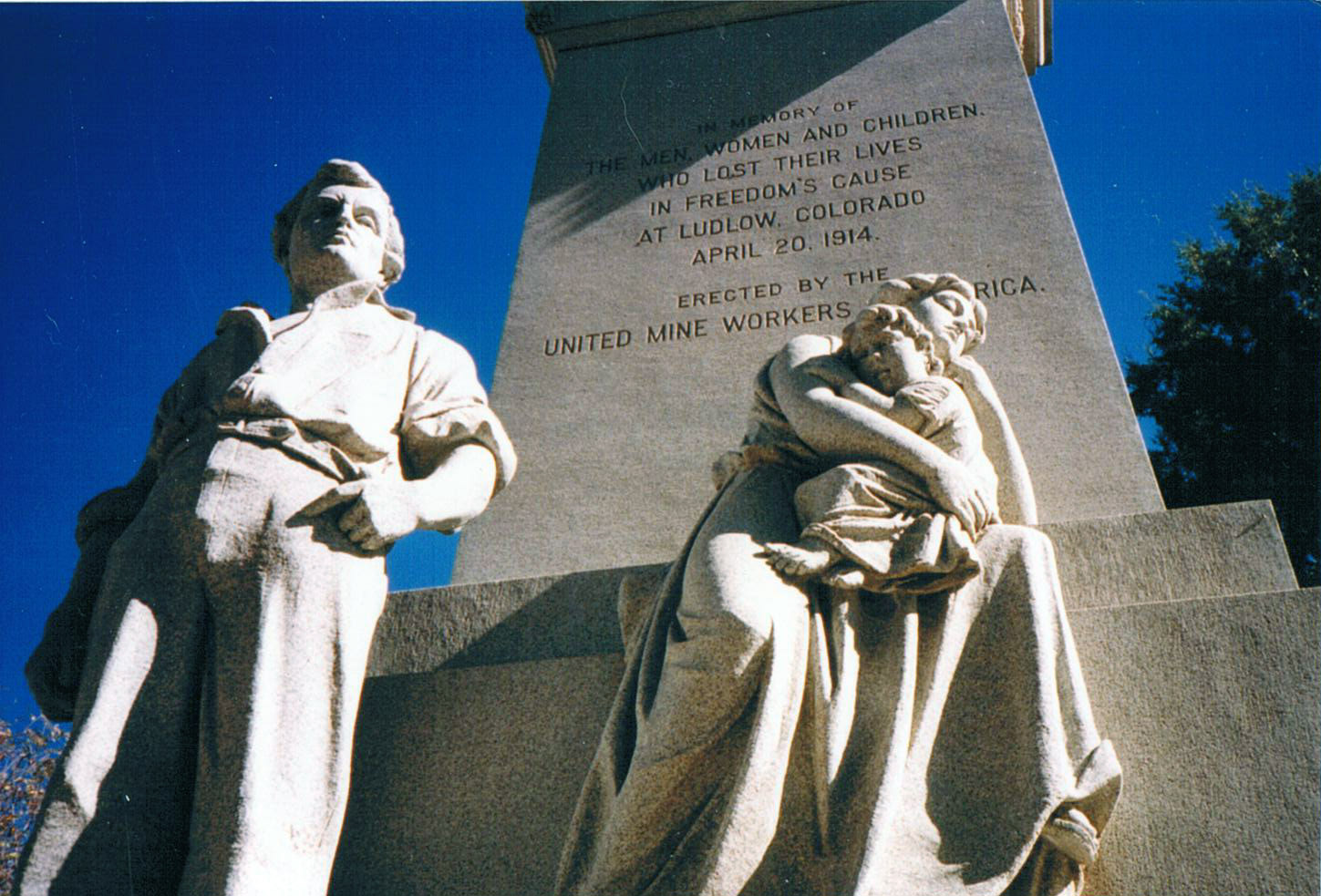
The Ludlow Massacre Memorial, 20 April 1914, Colorado Coal Miners on Strike (3453614459)

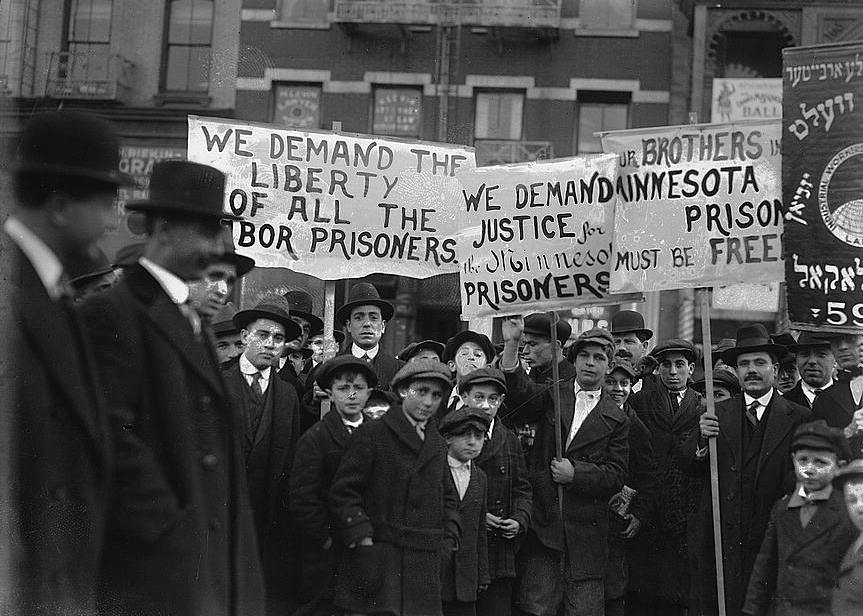
A "Sympathy Labor Parade" in New York during the Minnesota Iron Range Strike, 1916

20 April 1914 (United States)
The "Ludlow Massacre." In an attempt to persuade strikers at Colorado's Ludlow Mine Field to return to work, company "guards," engaged by John D. Rockefeller Jr. and other mine operators and sworn into the State Militia just for the occasion, attacked a union tent camp with machine guns, then set it afire. Five men, two women and 12 children died as a result.

20 May 1914 (United States)
1914–1915 Fulton Bag and Cotton Mills strike begins in Atlanta, Georgia.

13 November 1914 (United States)
A Western Federation of Miners strike is crushed by the militia in Butte, Montana.

1915 (United States)
U.S. Congress passed the La Follette Seamen's Act regulating working conditions for seamen.

1915 (United States)
Bayonne refinery strikes of 1915–1916 against Standard Oil began.

1915 (United States)
Youngstown, Ohio, Steel Strike occurred.

19 January 1915 (United States)
Twenty rioting strikers were shot by factory guards at Roosevelt, New Jersey.

25 January 1915 (United States)
The Supreme Court upholds "yellow dog" contracts, which forbid membership in labor unions.

1916 (United States)
U.S. Congress passed the Federal Child Labor Law, which was later ruled unconstitutional.

1916 (United States)
U.S. Congress passed the Adamson Act, which established an eight-hour workday for railroad workers.

1916 (United States)
American Federation of Teachers founded.

1916 (United States)
Arizona Copper Strike

1916 (United States)
Minnesota Iron Range Strike

1916 (United States)
New York City Transit Strike

1916 (United States)
New York Cloakmakers' Strike

1916 (United States)
San Francisco Open Shop Campaign began.

1916 (United States)
Bayonne refinery strikes of 1915–1916 against Standard Oil continued.

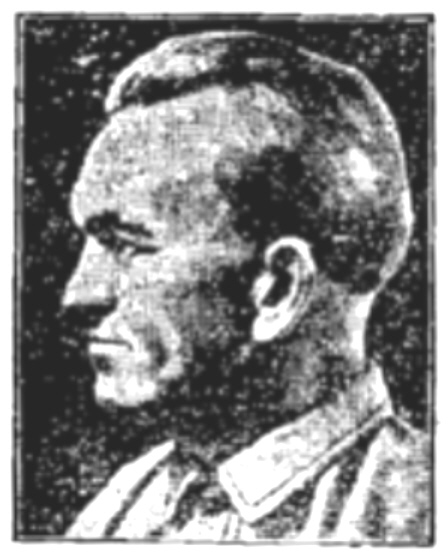
Thomas Mooney (1882-1942), American socialist

22 July 1916 (United States)
A bomb was set off during a "Preparedness Day" parade in San Francisco, killing 10 and injuring 40 more. Thomas J. Mooney, a labor organizer and Warren K. Billings, a shoe worker, were convicted, but were both pardoned in 1939.

19 August 1916 (United States)
Strikebreakers hired by the Everett Mills owner Neil Jamison attacked and beat picketing strikers in Everett, Washington. Local police watched and refused to intervene.

Three days later, twenty-two union men attempted to speak out at a local crossroads, but each was arrested; arrests and beatings of strikebreakers became common throughout the following months, and on 30 October vigilantes forced IWW speakers to run the gauntlet, subjecting them to whipping, tripping kicking, and impalement against a spiked cattle guard at the end of the gauntlet. In response, the IWW called for a meeting on 5 November. When the union men arrived, they were fired on; seven people were killed, 50 were wounded, and an indeterminate number wound up missing.

7 September 1916 (United States)
Federal employees win the right to receive Worker's Compensation insurance.

Newspaper headline about the Everett massacre, 1916 November 5

5 November 1916 (United States)
The Everett Massacre (also known as Bloody Sunday) was an armed confrontation between local authorities and members of the Industrial Workers of the World (IWW) union, commonly called "Wobblies", which took place in Everett, Washington on Sunday, 5 November 1916. The tragic event marked a time of rising tensions in Pacific Northwest labor history.

1917 (United States)
In "Hitchman Coal and Coke vs. Mitchell", U.S. Supreme Court upholds the legality of yellow-dog contracts.

1917 (United States)
Green Corn Rebellion occurred.

Timeline of labour issues and events
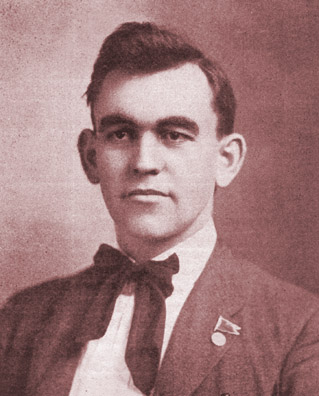
- Tom Mooney as a young socialist, 1910
- Born: 1882
- Died: 1942 (aged 59–60)

1917 (United States)
Thomas Mooney sentenced to death for his participation in the San Francisco Preparedness Day Bombing of 1916.

1917 (United States)
East St. Louis Race Riot occurred.

15 March 1917 (United States)
The Supreme Court approved the Eight-Hour Act under the threat of a national railway strike.

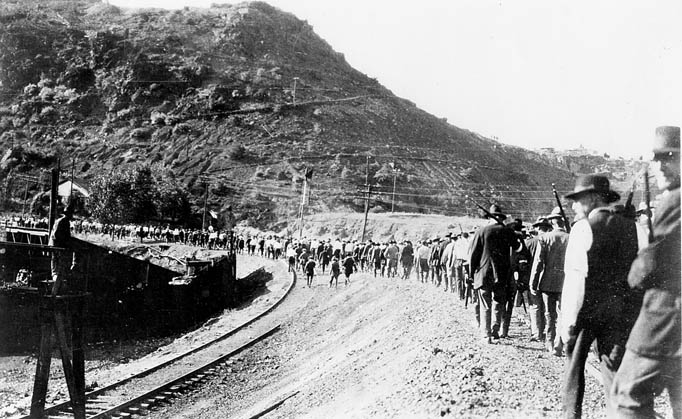
Deportation of striking miners from Bisbee, Arizona, on 12 July 1917. Striking miners and others are marched from Warren Ballpark along railroad tracks toward cattle cars belonging to the El Paso and Southwestern Railroad.

12 July 1917 (United States)
The Bisbee Deportation: After seizing the local Western Union telegraph office in order to cut off outside communication, several thousand armed vigilantes forced 1,185 men in Bisbee, Arizona into manure-laden boxcars and "deported" them to the New Mexico desert. The action was precipitated by a strike when workers' demands (including improvements to safety and working conditions at the local copper mines, an end to discrimination against labor organizations and unequal treatment of foreign and minority workers, and the institution of a fair wage system) went unmet. The "deportation" was organized by Sheriff Harry Wheeler. The incident was investigated months later by a Federal Mediation Commission set up by President Woodrow Wilson; the Commission found that no federal law applied, and referred the case to the State of Arizona, which failed to take any action, citing patriotism and support for the war as justification for the vigilantes' action.

1 August 1917 (United States)
IWW organizer Frank Little was lynched in Butte, Montana.

5 September 1917 (United States)
Federal agents raid the IWW headquarters in 48 cities.

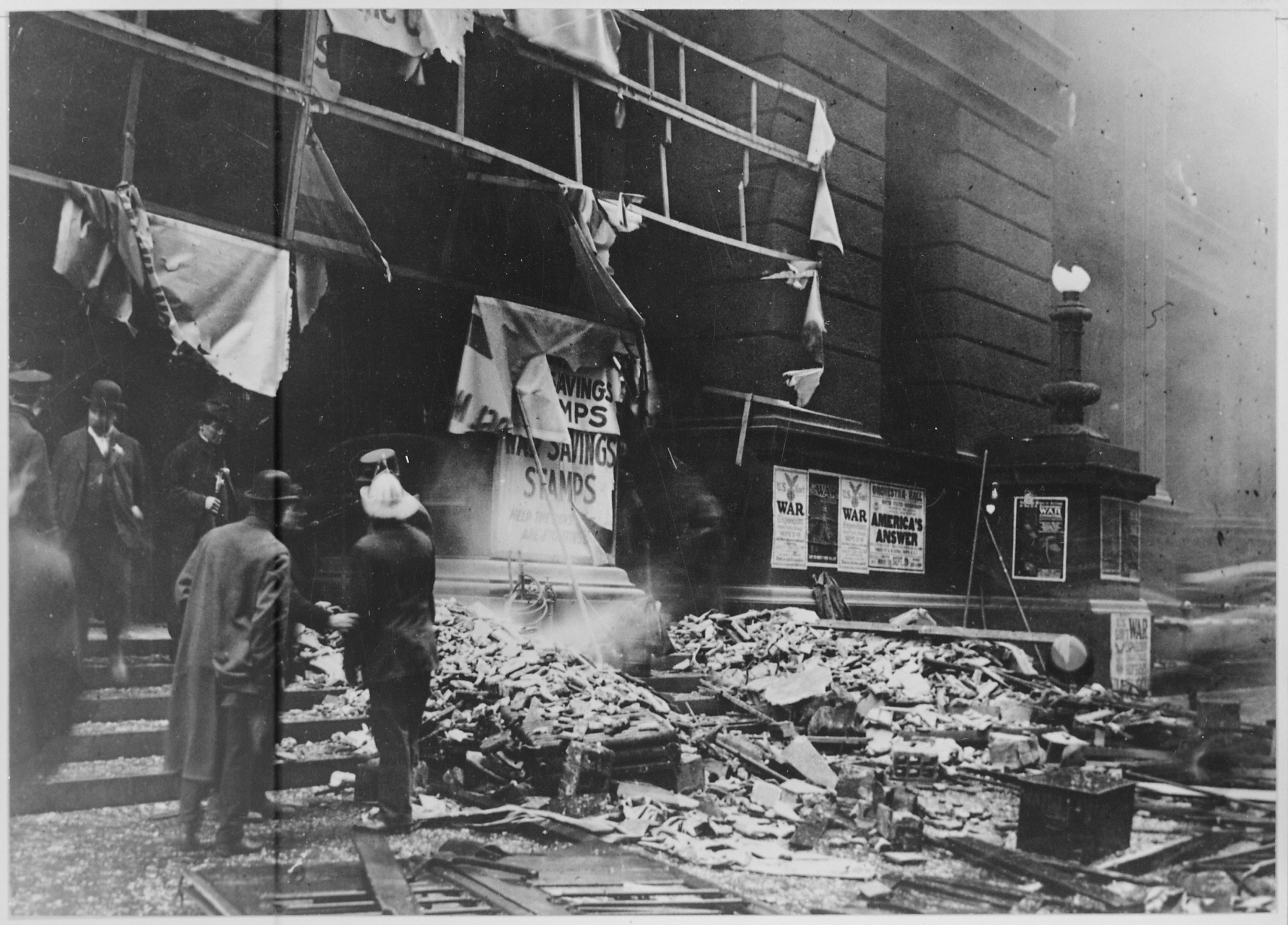
The wreckage of Chicago's Federal Building after the explosion of a bomb allegedly planted by the Industrial Workers of the World (IWW)...1918

1918 (United States)
War Labor Board created.
War Labor Policies Board (1918-1919) created

3 June 1918 (United States)
A Federal child labor law, enacted two years earlier, was declared unconstitutional. A new law was enacted 24 February 1919, but this one too was declared unconstitutional (on 2 June 1924).

27 July 1918 (Canada)
United Mine Workers organizer Ginger Goodwin was shot by a hired private policeman outside Cumberland, British Columbia.

15 November 1918 (Germany)
Stinnes-Legien Agreement between trade unions and employers.

1919 (EUROPE)
International Federation of Trade Unions is founded.

1919 (United States)
Farmer-Labor Party founded.
Communist Party of America founded.
Cleveland May Day riots occurred.
Red Scare began.
Actors Strike occurred.
Chicago Race Riot occurred.
New England Telephone Strike occurred.
Seattle General Strike occurred.
Fall River, Massachusetts, Textile Strike occurred.

1919 (International)
The International Labour Organization (ILO), now a specialized agency of the United Nations, was formed through the negotiations of the Treaty of Versailles, and was initially an agency of the League of Nations.
25 August 1919 Charlotte North Carolina

The Battle of the Barn James B. Duke and Southern Company break strike by local streetcar motormen and conductors by calling in troops. Five dead. Youngest 17 years old. Nearly two dozen wounded.

26 August 1919 (United States)
United Mine Worker organizer Fannie Sellins was gunned down by company guards in Brackenridge, Pennsylvania.

19 September 1919 (United States)
Looting, rioting and sporadic violence broke out in downtown Boston and South Boston for days after 1,117 Boston policemen declared a work stoppage due to their thwarted attempts to affiliate with the American Federation of Labor. Massachusetts Governor Calvin Coolidge put down the strike by calling out the entire state militia.

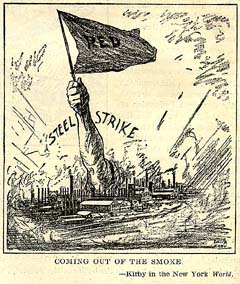
Coming out of the smoke : newspaper cartoon depicting the steel strike, New York World, 1919 October 11

22 September 1919 – 8 January 1920 (United States)
The "Great Steel Strike" began. Ultimately, 350,000 steel workers walked off their jobs to demand union recognition. The AFL Iron and Steel Organizing Committee called off the strike on 8 January 1920, their goals unmet.

11 November 1919 (United States)
Centralia Massacre -- IWW organizer Wesley Everest was lynched after a Centralia, Washington IWW hall was attacked by Legionnaires.

22 December 1919 (United States)
Amid a strike for union recognition by 395,000 steelworkers (ultimately unsuccessful), approximately 250 "anarchists," "communists," and "labor agitators" were deported to Russia, marking the beginning of the so-called "Red Scare."

== 1920s ==
1920 (International)
The ICFTU is founded, later to become the World Confederation of Labour.

1920 (United States)
Trade Union Educational League founded.

1920 (United States)
Alabama Miners' Strike occurred.

1920 (United States)
Clothing Workers' Lockout occurred.

2 January 1920 (United States)
The U.S. Bureau of Investigation began carrying out the nationwide Palmer Raids.

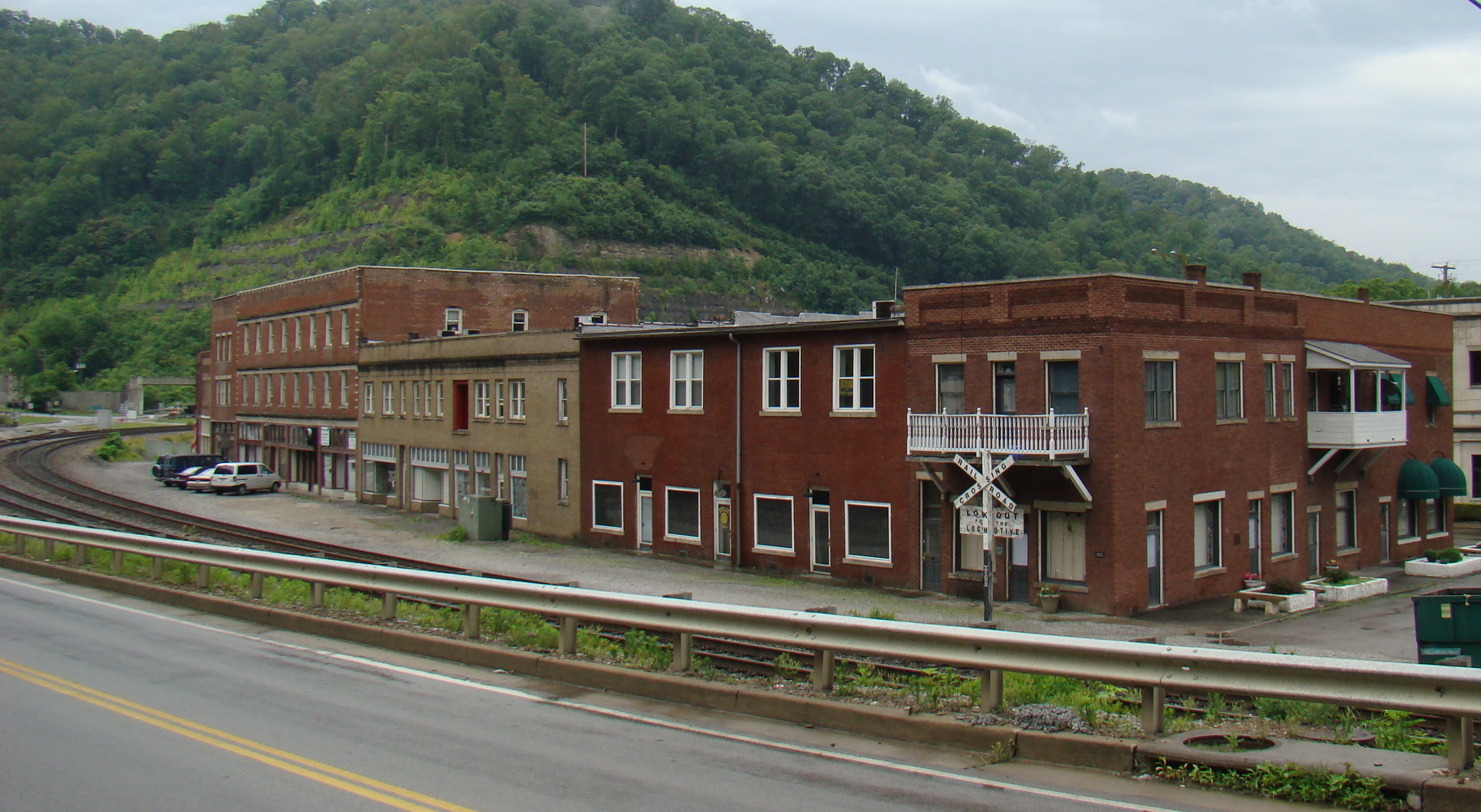
View of Matewan, West Virginia. Matewan Historic District, a National Historic Landmark, was the site of the Battle of Matewan in May 1920 during a coal miners' strike.

19 May 1920 (United States)
The Battle of Matewan. Despite efforts by police chief (and former miner) Sid Hatfield and Mayor Cabel Testerman to protect miners from interference in their union drive in Matewan, West Virginia, Baldwin-Felts detectives hired by the local mining company arrived to evict miners and their families from the Stone Mountain Mine camp. A gun battle ensued, resulting in the deaths of 7 detectives, Mayor Testerman, and 2 miners. The movie Matewan is based on the event.

Baldwin-Felts detectives assassinated Sid Hatfield 15 months later, sparking off an armed rebellion of 10,000 West Virginia coal miners at the "Battle of Blair Mountain," dubbed the "redneck war" and "the largest insurrection this country has had since the Civil War." Army troops later intervened against the striking mineworkers in West Virginia.

1921 (United States)
U.S. Supreme Court rules in Duplex Printing Press vs. Deering that federal courts could enjoin unions for actions in restraint of trade despite the Clayton Act.

1921 (United States)
Seamen's Strike occurred.

1921 (United States)
West Virginia Coal Wars continued.

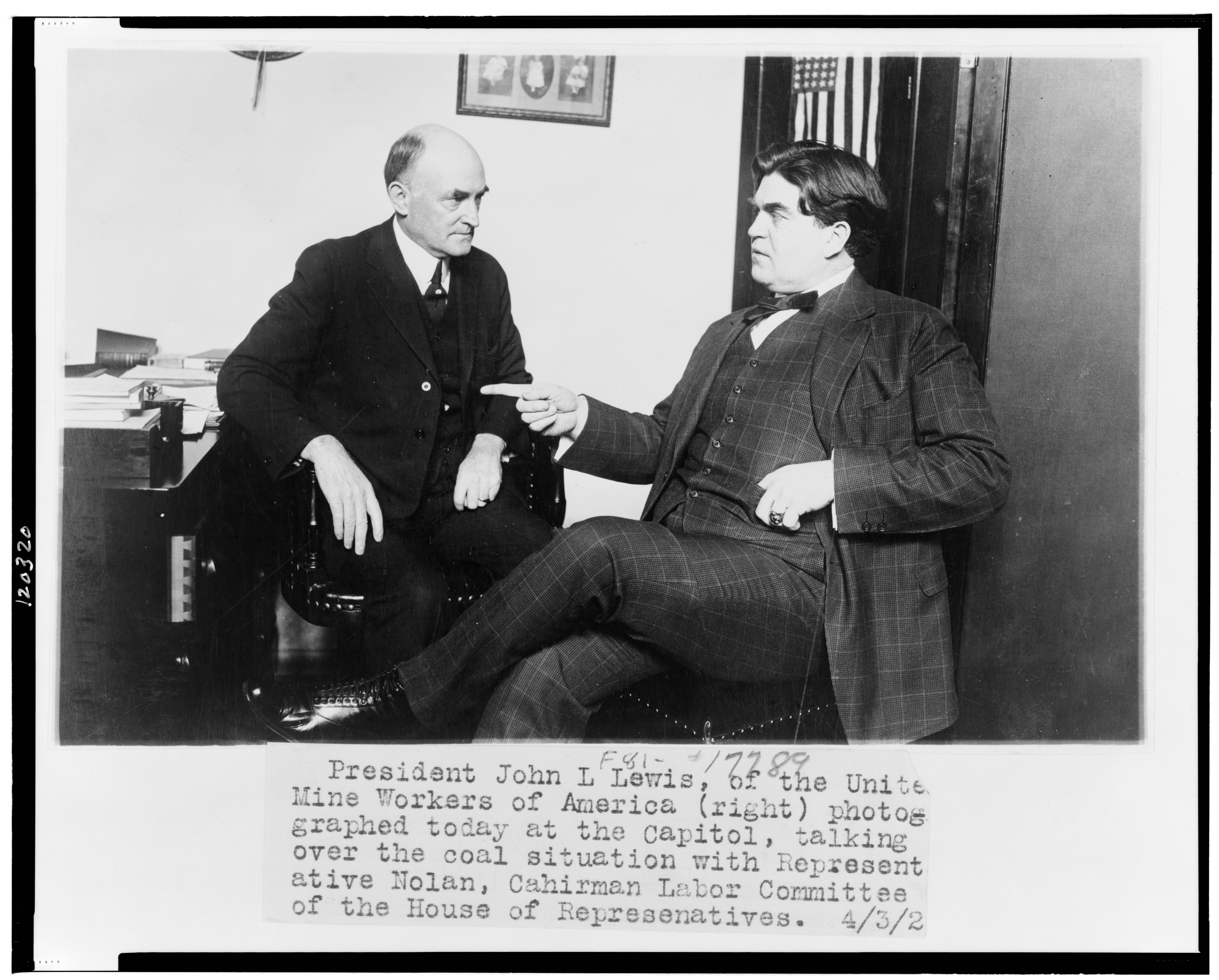
President John L. Lewis, of the United Mine Workers of America (right) photographed today at the Capitol, talking over the coal situation with Representative Nolan, Chairman of the Labor Committee of the House of Representatives, 1922 April 3

1922 (United States)
Conference for Progressive Political Action founded.

1 April 1922 (United States)
UMW General coal strike occurred.

22 June 1922 (United States)
Herrin massacre: Thirty-six people are killed, 21 of them non-union miners, during a coal-mine strike at Herrin, Illinois.

July 1922 (United States)
Great Railroad Strike of 1922.

15 November 1922 (Ecuador)
A three-day general strike in Guayaquil ends after police and military kill at least 300 strikers.

1 September 1922 (United States)
Federal judge James Herbert Wilkerson issues a sweeping injunction against striking, assembling, picketing, and a variety of other union activities, known as the "Daugherty Injunction."

14 June 1923 (United States)
San Pedro Maritime strike, California IWW hall was raided. Several children were scalded when the hall was demolished.

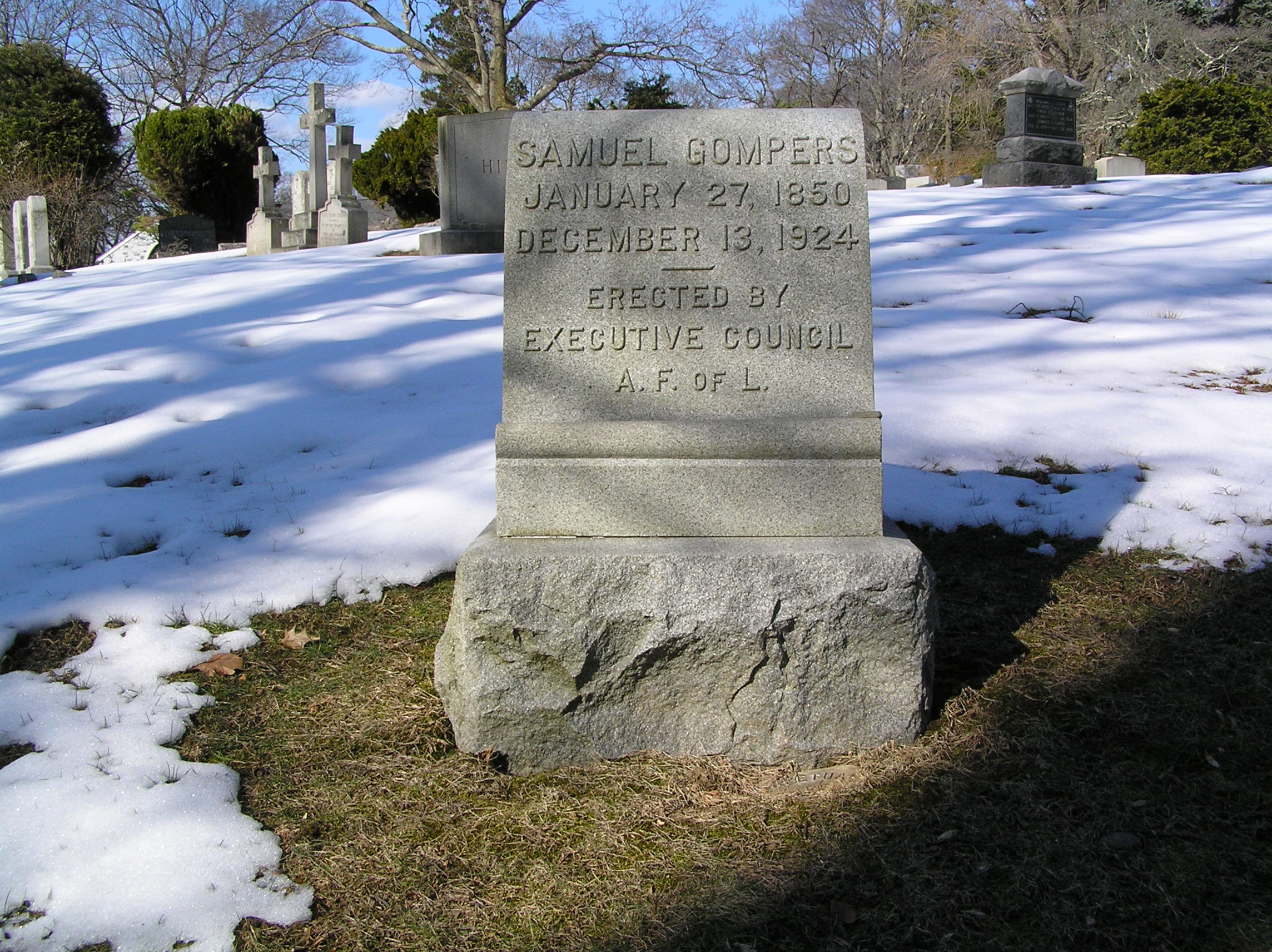
Samuel Gompers Gravesite in Sleepy Hollow Cemetery

1924 (United States)
Samuel Gompers died. William Green elected to succeed him as president of the American Federation of Labor.

2 June 1924 (United States)
Child Labor Amendment to the U.S. Constitution was proposed. Only 28 of the necessary 36 states ever ratified it.

9 September 1924 (United States)
16 Filipino strikers killed during the Hanapepe massacre.

1925 (United States)
Brotherhood of Sleeping Car Porters founded.

1925 (United States)
Anthracite Coal Strike occurred.

1 May 1925 (China)
The All-China Federation of Trade Unions (ACFTU) was officially founded. With 134 million members it is the largest trade union in the world. However many, such as the International Confederation of Free Trade Unions, maintain the position that the ACFTU is not an independent trade union organization.

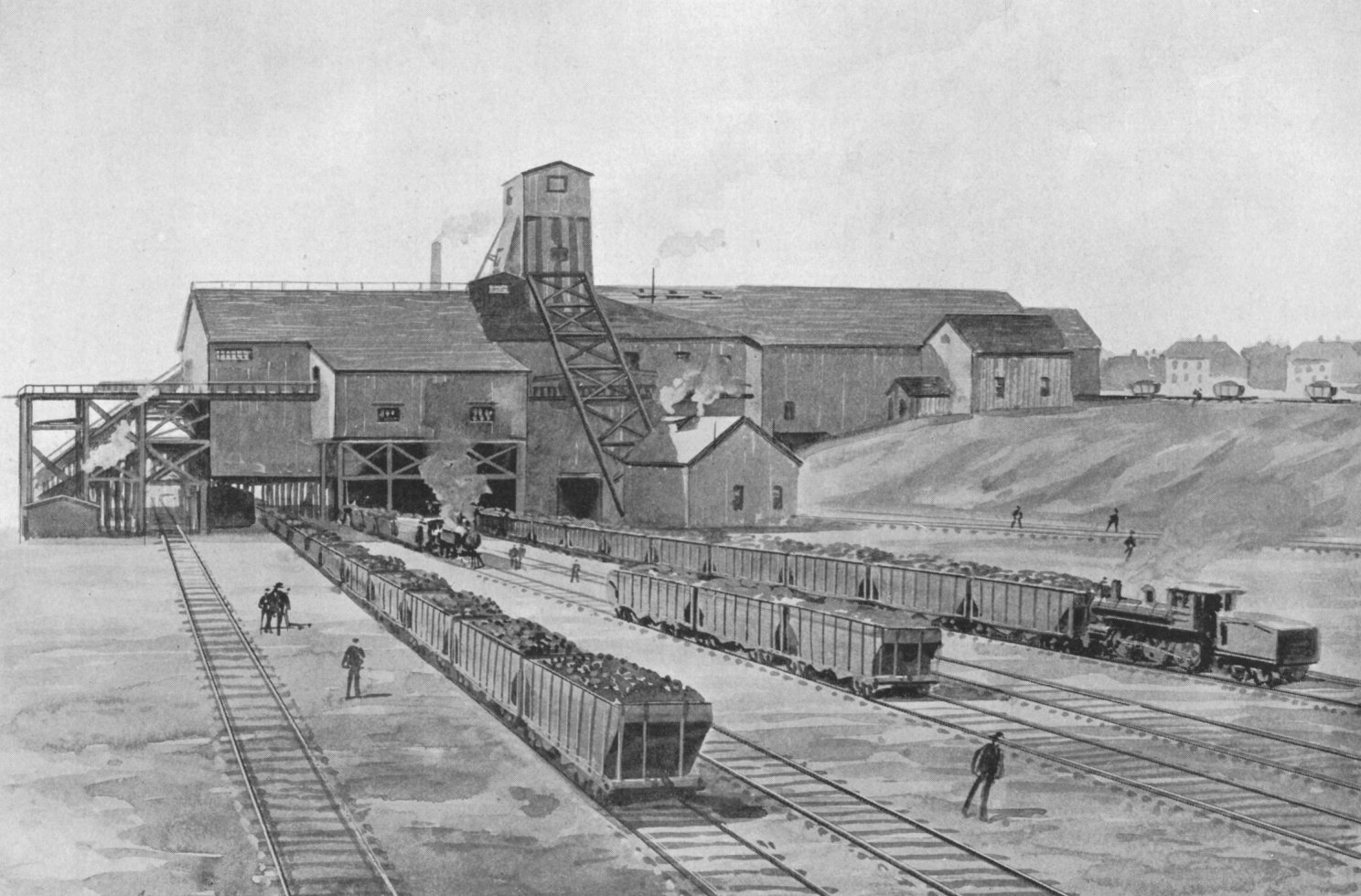
A Dominion Coal Company colliery in Reserve Mines, Nova Scotia, ca. 1900. This mine would become one of numerous assets of the Dominion Steel and Coal Corporation upon its founding in 1928 through corporate acquisitions.

11 June 1925 (Canada)
1 coal miner was killed and many injured during a protest as a result of a major strike at the British Empire Steel and Coal Company (BESCO) in New Waterford, Nova Scotia. Davis Day was established in the memory of Bill Davis, the miner who was murdered by company police. The labor dispute resulted in the deployment of 2,000 soldiers during the largest peacetime deployment of the Canadian Army for an internal conflict since the North-West Rebellion of 1885.

1926 (United States)
The Railway Labor Act passed. It required employers, for the first time and under penalty of law, to bargain collectively and not to discriminate against their employees for joining a union. It provided also for mediation, voluntary arbitration, fact-finding boards, cooling off periods and adjustment boards.

Textile workers fought with police in Passaic, New Jersey. A year-long strike ensued.

1926 (United States)
Passaic, New Jersey, Textile Strike occurred.

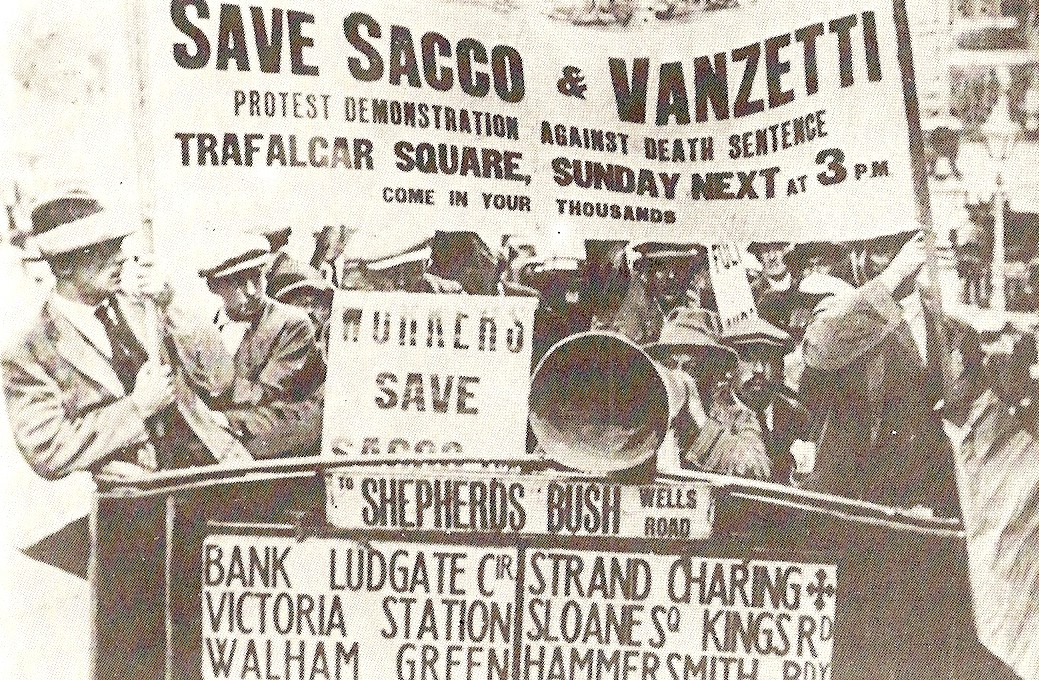
Protest for Sacco and Vanzetti in London, 1921

1927 (United States)
Ferdinando Nicola Sacco and Bartolomeo Vanzetti were executed.

21 November 1927 (United States)
Picketing coal miners marching under the banner of the Industrial Workers of the World were massacred in the Columbine Mine massacre in the company town of Serene, Colorado.

1928 (United States)
New Bedford, Massachusetts, Textile Strike occurred.

1 April 1929 Loray Mill Strike in Gastonia, North Carolina (United States)
Violent and relatively unsuccessful Loray Mill Strike during which the National Guard was called, and 100+ masked men destroyed the National Textile Workers Union (NTWU) building. Crushing Southern textile worker's collective bargaining efforts made a furor in US national news, giving momentum and urgency to the more successful labor movement of the 1930s

1929 (United States)
Trade Union Unity League founded.

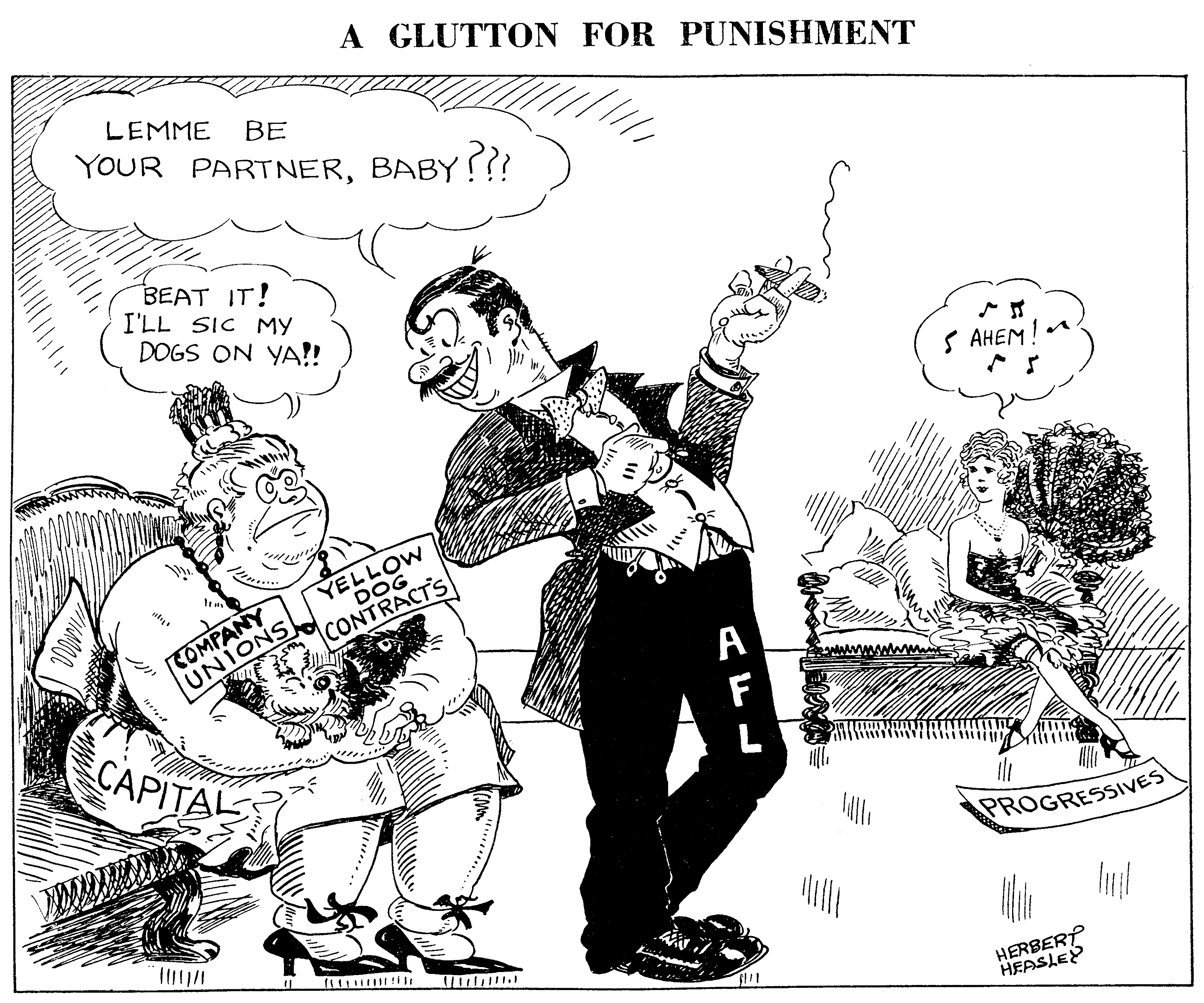
This cartoon from the monthly magazine of the CPLA illustrates the organization's view of the American Federation of Labor.

1929 (United States)
Conference for Progressive Labor Action founded.

1929 (United States)
Gastonia, North Carolina, Textile Strike occurred.

1929 (Australia)
The 1929 Timber Workers strike was the first large strike after the onset of the Great Depression in Australia arising from a new timber industry award that increased the working week from 44 to 48 hours and reduced wages. A fifteen-month lockout during 1929-1930 of miners on the Northern New South Wales Coalfields was particularly bitter with police shooting at miners, killing Norman Brown and seriously injuring many more at the Rothbury Riot.

== 1930s ==
1930 (United States)
National Unemployed Council founded.

3 February 1930 (United States)
"Chicagorillas" -- labor racketeers -- shot and killed contractor William Healy, with whom the Chicago Marble Setters Union had been having difficulties.

14 April 1930 (United States)
Imperial Valley Farmworkers' Strike occurred. Over 100 farm workers were arrested for their unionizing activities in Imperial Valley, California. Eight were subsequently convicted of "criminal syndicalism."

1931 (United States)
U.S. Congress passes the Davis–Bacon Act.

1931 (United States)
Scottsboro Boys arrested in Alabama.

4 May 1931 (United States)
Harlan County Miners' Strike began in Harlan County, Kentucky when gun-toting vigilantes attacked striking miners.

14 May 1931 (Sweden)
Five persons were killed by bullets fired by Swedish military troops called in as reinforcements by the police during a protest later known as Ådalen shootings.

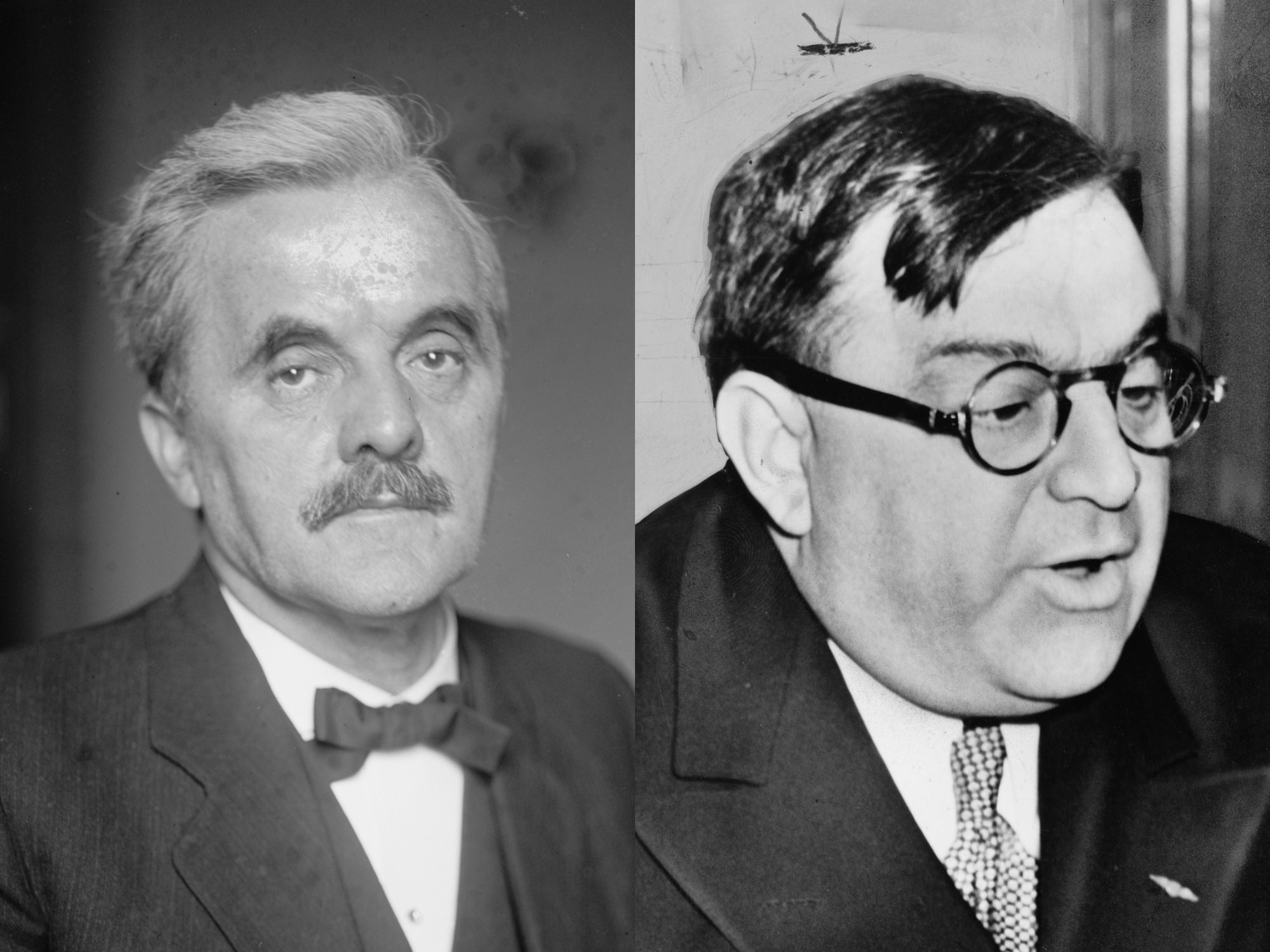
Senator George W. Norris of Nebraska and Representative Fiorello H. La Guardia of New York, both Republicans, were the chief sponsors of the Norris–Laguardia Act

10 October 1931 (Spain)
The Juntas de Ofensiva Nacional-Sindicalista is founded, being the first organization that proclaims itself as national syndicalist

1932 (United States)
U.S. Congress passed the Norris–La Guardia Act outlawing yellow-dog contracts and prohibiting federal injunctions in labor disputes.

1932 (United States)
World War I veterans march on Washington, D.C., in the Bonus March.

1932 (United States)
American Federation of Government Employees founded.

1932 (United States)
California Pea Pickers' Strike occurred.

1932 (United States)
Century Airlines Pilots' Strike occurred.

1932 (United States)
Davidson-Wilder, Tennessee Coal Strike occurred.

1932 (United States)
Ford Hunger March occurred in Detroit, Michigan.

1932 (United States)
Vacaville, California, Tree Pruners' Strike occurred.

7 March 1932 (United States)
Police kill striking workers at Ford's Dearborn, Michigan plant.

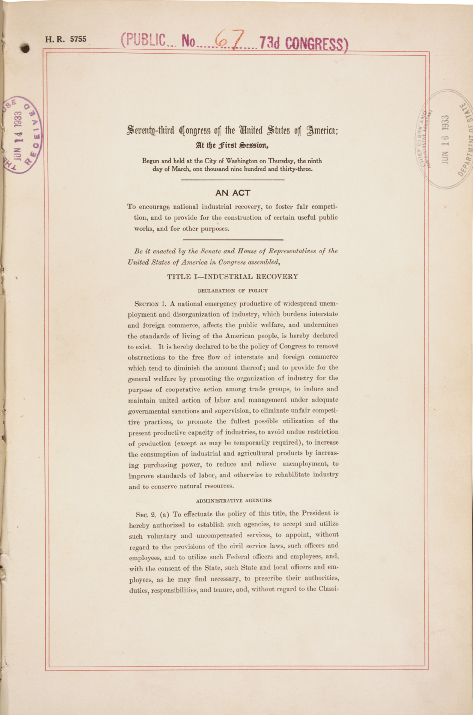
Front page of the National Industrial Recovery Act, as signed by President Franklin D. Roosevelt on 16 June 1933.

2 May 1933 (Germany)
The ADGB Trade Union School (Bundesschule des Allgemeiner Deutsche Gewerkschaftsbund (ADGB)), was confiscated by the Nazis. Until the end of World War II the site was used by the Reich Leadership School.

1933 (United States)
National Industrial Recovery Act passed by the U.S. Congress. The Act guaranteed the rights of employees to organize and enter into collective bargaining.

1933 (United States)
Newspaper Guild founded.

1933 (United States)
Briggs Manufacturing Strike occurred.

1933 (United States)
Detroit, Michigan, Tool and Die Strike occurred.

1933 (United States)
Hormel, Iowa, Meat-Packing Strike occurred.

1933 (United States)
New Mexico Miners' Strike occurred.

10 October 1933 (United States)
18,000 cotton workers went on strike in Pixley, California. Four were killed before a pay-hike was finally won.

1934 (United States)
Southern Tenant Farmers Union founded.

1934 (United States)
Harlem, New York, Jobs-for-Negroes Boycott occurred.

1934 (United States)
Imperial Valley Farmworkers' Strike occurred.

1934 (United States)
The Electric Auto-Lite Strike. In Toledo, Ohio, two strikers were killed and over two hundred wounded by National Guardsmen. Some 1,300 National Guard troops, including included eight rifle companies and three machine gun companies, were called in to disperse as many as 10,000 strikers and protestors.

1934 (United States)
''Newark Star-Ledger'' Strike occurred.

1934 (United States)
Rubber Workers' Strike occurred.

1934 (United States)
Honea Path massacre occurred with 6 striking textile worker shot in the back running from a picket line. This event is featured in the Public Broadcasting Service (PBS) documentary on the POV series called "The Uprising of '34". An historical photo essay entitled "Mill Town Murder" is online at Beacham Journal .

1934 (United States)
Textile Workers' Strike occurred.

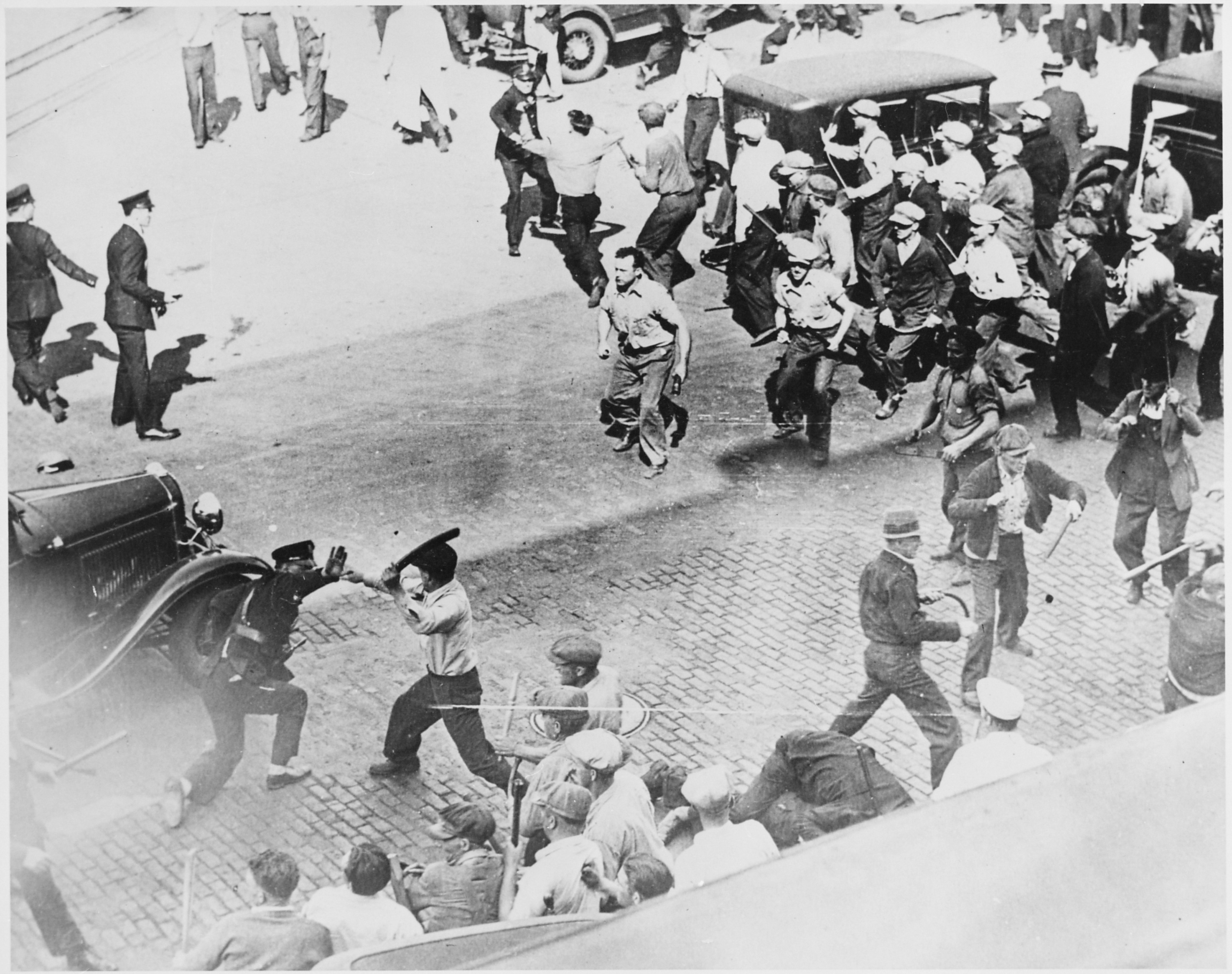
Open battle between striking teamsters armed with pipes and the police in the streets of Minneapolis, June 1934.

May 1934 (United States)
Minneapolis Teamsters Strike of 1934 occurred. Police attacked and fired upon striking Teamster truck drivers in Minneapolis who were demanding recognition of their union, wage increases, and shorter working hours. As violence escalated, Governor Olson went so far as to declare martial law in Minneapolis, deploying 4,000 National Guardsmen. The strike ended on 21 August when company owners finally accepted union demands.

5 July 1934 (United States)
1934 San Francisco General Strike Bloody Thursday - West Coast & San Francisco General Strike.

1–22 September 1934 (United States)
A strike in Woonsocket, Rhode Island, part of a national movement to obtain a minimum wage for textile workers, resulted in the deaths of three workers. Over 420,000 workers ultimately went on strike.

1935 (United States)
U.S. Supreme Court ruled that the National Industrial Recovery Act was unconstitutional.

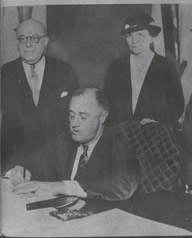
Francis Perkins looks on as Franklin Roosevelt signs the Wagner-Peyser Bill creating the US Employment Service, 6 June 1935

1935 (United States)
The National Labor Relations Act, also known as the Wagner Act, was passed. It clearly established the right of all workers to organize and to elect their representative for collective bargaining purposes.

1935 (United States)
Negro Labor Committee founded.

1935 (United States)
United Auto Workers founded.

1935 (United States)
Oklahoma, Kansas, and Missouri Metal Workers' Strike occurred.

1935 (United States)
Pacific Northwest Lumber Strike occurred.

1935 (United States)
Southern Sharecroppers' and Farm Laborers' Strike occurred.

9 November 1935 (United States)
The Committee for Industrial Organizations (CIO) was formed to expand industrial unionism.

1936 (United States)
Steel Workers Organizing Committee, one of two labor organizations that eventually merged to form the United Steelworkers, founded.

1936 (United States)
Atlanta Auto Workers' Sit-down Strike occurred.

20 November 1936 (Spain)
National syndicalist leader José Antonio Primo de Rivera was executed.

1936 (United States)
Berkshire Knitting Mills Strike occurred.

1936 (United States)
General Motors Sit-Down Strike occurred.

1936 (United States)
RCA Strike occurred.

1936 (United States)
Rubber Workers' Sit-down Strike occurred.

1936 (United States)
Seamen's Strike occurred.

1936 (United States)
Seattle Post-Intelligencer Newspaper Strike occurred.

1937 (United States)
U.S. Supreme Court ruled that the National Labor Relations Act is constitutional.

1937 (United States)
American Federation of Labor ejected the unions that would later form the Committee of Industrial Organizations.

1937 (United States)
American Federation of State, County, and Municipal Employees Union founded.

1937 (United States)
Hershey, Pennsylvania, Chocolate Workers' Strike founded.

1937 (United States)
Little Steel Strike occurred.

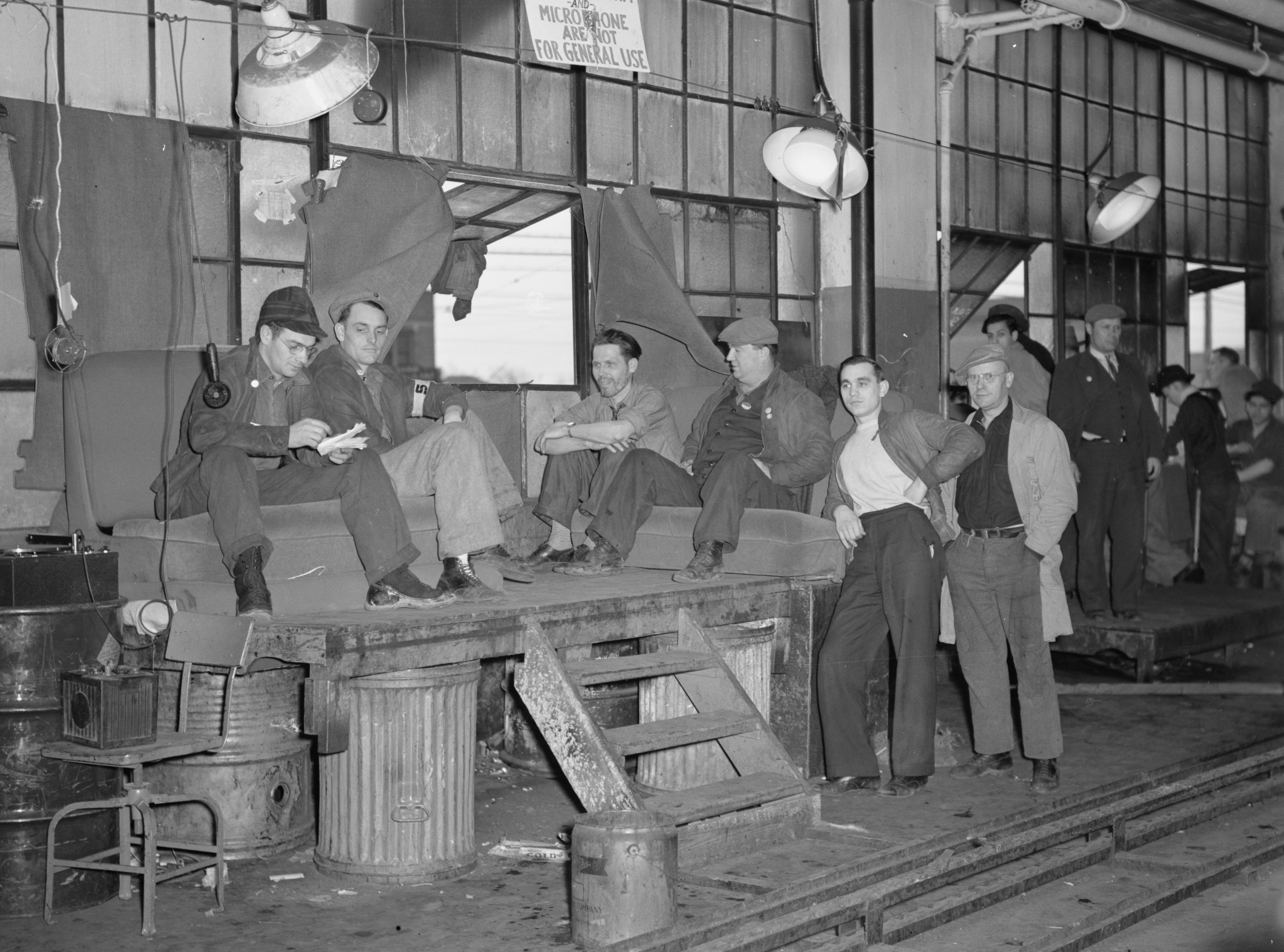
Sit-down strikers guarding window entrance to Fisher body plant number three. Photo by Sheldon Dick, 1937.

11 February 1937 (United States)
General Motors recognizes the United Auto Workers union following a sit-down strike in Flint, Michigan, that began in December 1936.

Two months later, company guards beat up United Auto Workers leaders at the River Rouge Plant, in River Rouge, Michigan.

30 May 1937 (United States)
Police kill 10 and wounded 30 during the Memorial Day Massacre at the Republic Steel plant in Chicago.

1938 (United States)
Congress of Industrial Organizations founded.

1938 (United States)
Chicago Newspaper Strike occurred.

1938 (United States)
Hilo, Hawaii, Massacre occurred.

1938 (United States)
Maytag Strike occurred.

25 June 1938 (United States)
The Wages and Hours (later Fair Labor Standards) Act is passed, banning child labor and setting the 40-hour work week. The Act went into effect in October 1940, and was upheld in the Supreme Court on 3 February 1941.

1939 (United States)
Chrysler Auto Strike occurred.

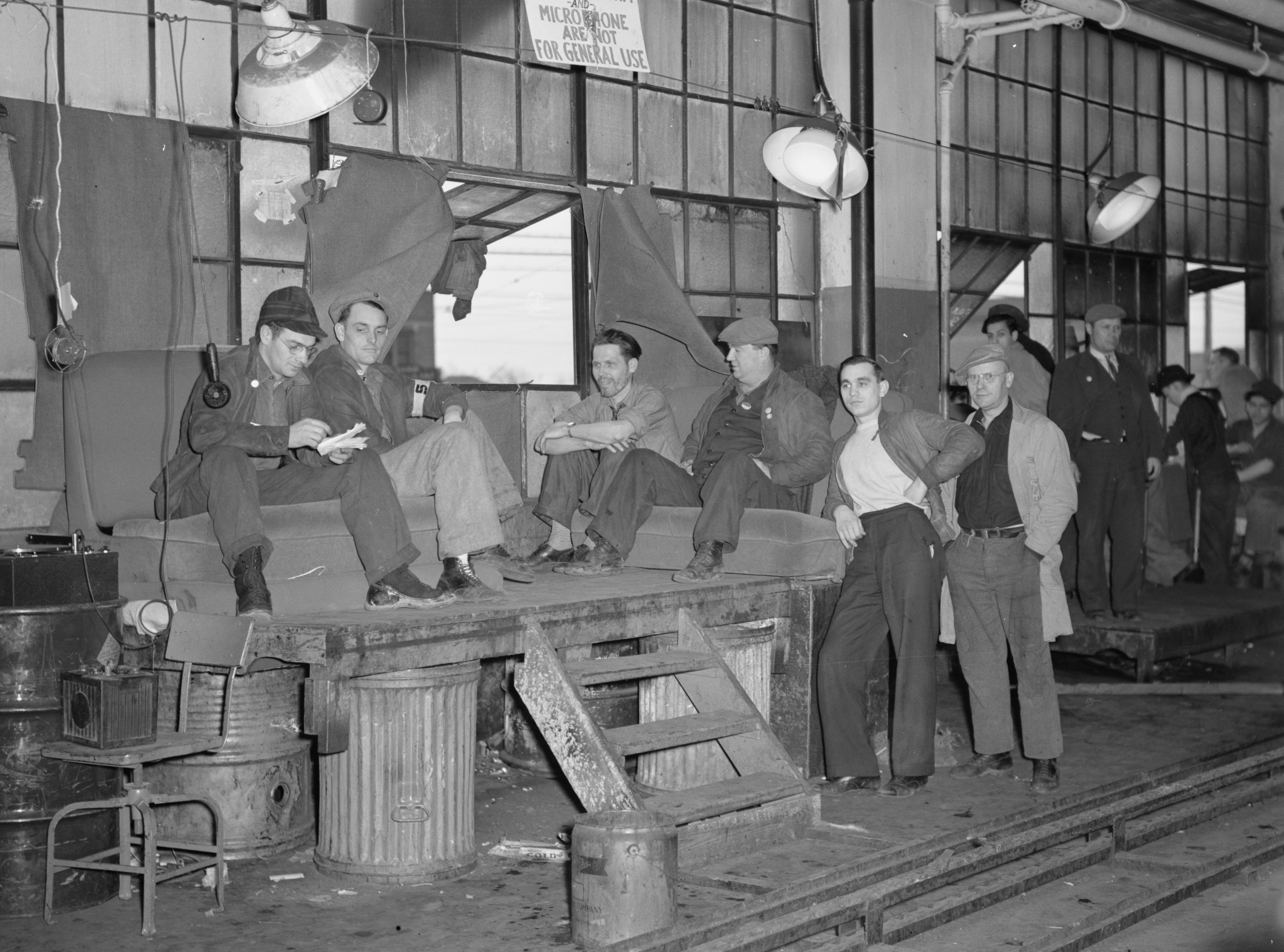
Flint Sit-Down Strike window

1939 (United States)
General Motors Tool and Die Makers' Strike occurred.

27 February 1939 (United States)
The Supreme Court rules that sit-down strikes are illegal.

== 1940s ==
1940 (United States)
Philip Murray elected president of the Congress of Industrial Organizations replacing John L. Lewis.

1940 (United States)
Ford Motor Strike occurred.

1941 (United States)
Allis-Chalmers Strike occurred.

1941 (United States)
Captive Coal Mines Strike occurred.

1941 (United States)
Detroit, Michigan Hate Strike against African Americans occurred.

1941 (United States)
International Harvester Strike occurred.

1941 (United States)
New York City Bus Strike occurred.

1941 (United States)
North American Aviation Strike occurred.

20 June 1941 (United States)
Henry Ford recognizes the UAW.

15 December 1941 (United States)
The AFL pledges that there will be no strikes in defense-related industry plants for the duration of the war.

1942 (United States)
National War Labor Board was established; the NWLB established formula for wartime wage adjustments.

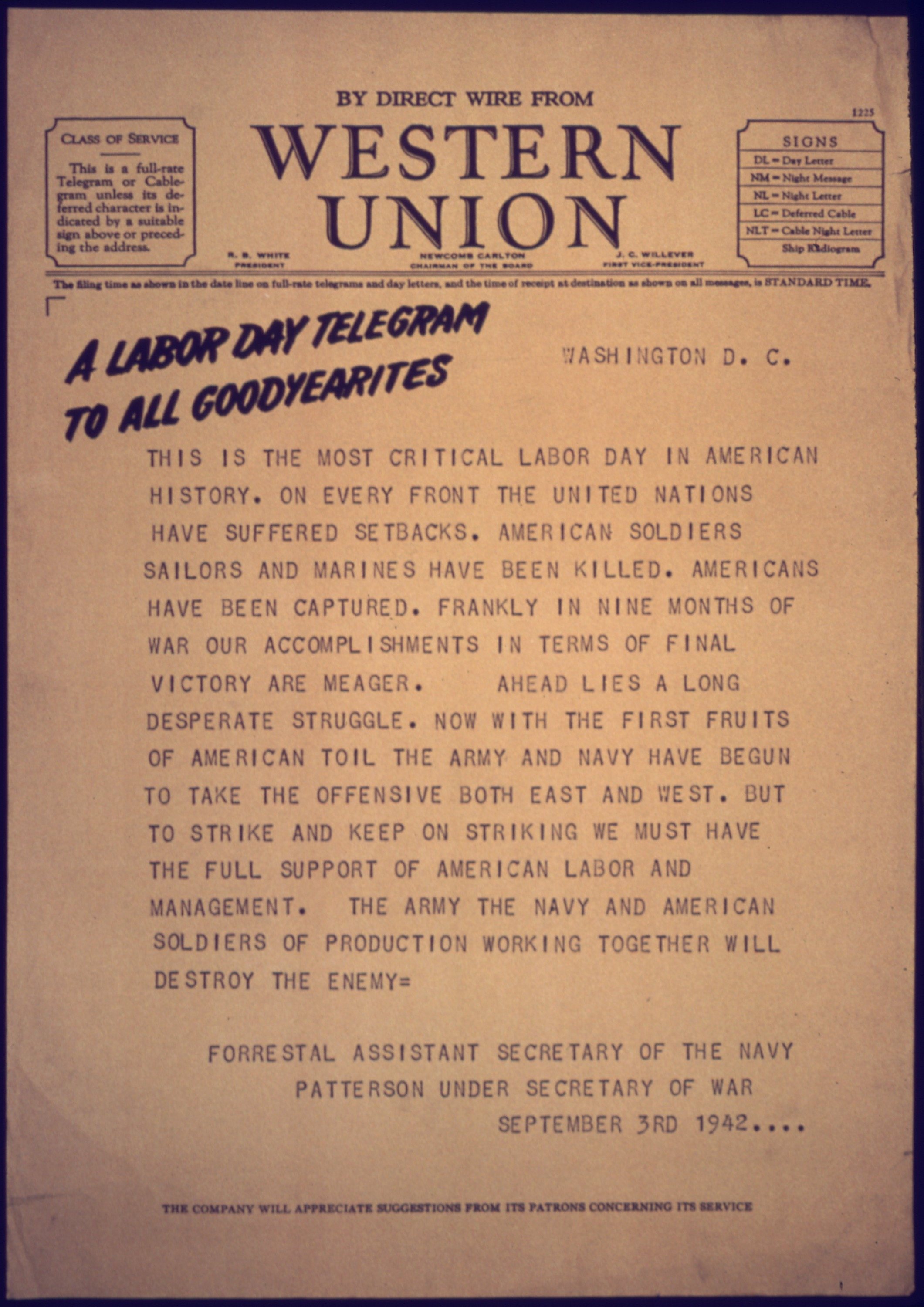
Western Union A Labor Day Telegram to All Goodyearites from Forrestal Assistant Secretary of the Navy, Patterson Under Secretary of War, 3 September 1942

1942 (United States)
United Steel Workers of America founded.

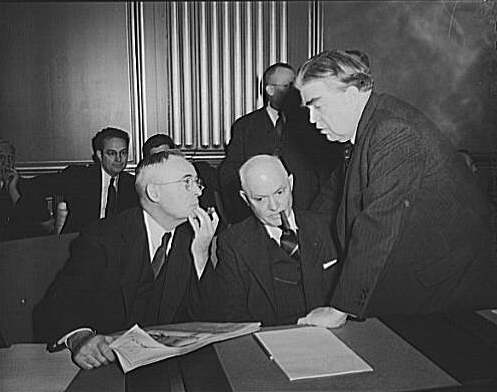
War Labor Board anthracite hearing. John L. Lewis (right), President of the United Mine Workers (UMW), confers with Thomas Kennedy (left), Secretary-Treasurer of the UMW, and Perry Tetlow (center), president of UMW District 17, at the War Labor Board conference 15 January 1943, about the anthracite coal miners' strike, 1943 January 15

1943 (United States)
Fair Employment Practices Commission founded.

1943 (United States)
Smith-Connolly Act passed by U.S. Congress. Act restricts the extent of political activities and strikes by unions during the duration of the war.

1943 (United States)
Bituminous Coal Strike occurred.

1943 (United States)
Detroit, Michigan Hate Strike against African Americans occurred.

1943 (United States)
Detroit Race Riots against African Americans occurred.

1944 (United States)
Philadelphia Transit Strike occurred.

28 December 1944 (United States)
President Franklin D. Roosevelt ordered the Army to seize the executive offices of Montgomery Ward and Company after the corporation failed to comply with a National War Labor Board directive regarding union shops.

1945 (International)
International Federation of Trade Unions becomes the World Federation of Trade Unions

1945 (United States)
Kelsey-Hayes Strike occurred.

1945 (United States)
New York City Longshoremen's Strike occurred.

1945 (United States)
Montgomery Ward Strike occurred.

1945 (United States)
Oil Workers' Strike occurred.

1946 (United States)
Workers in packinghouses nation-wide went on strike.

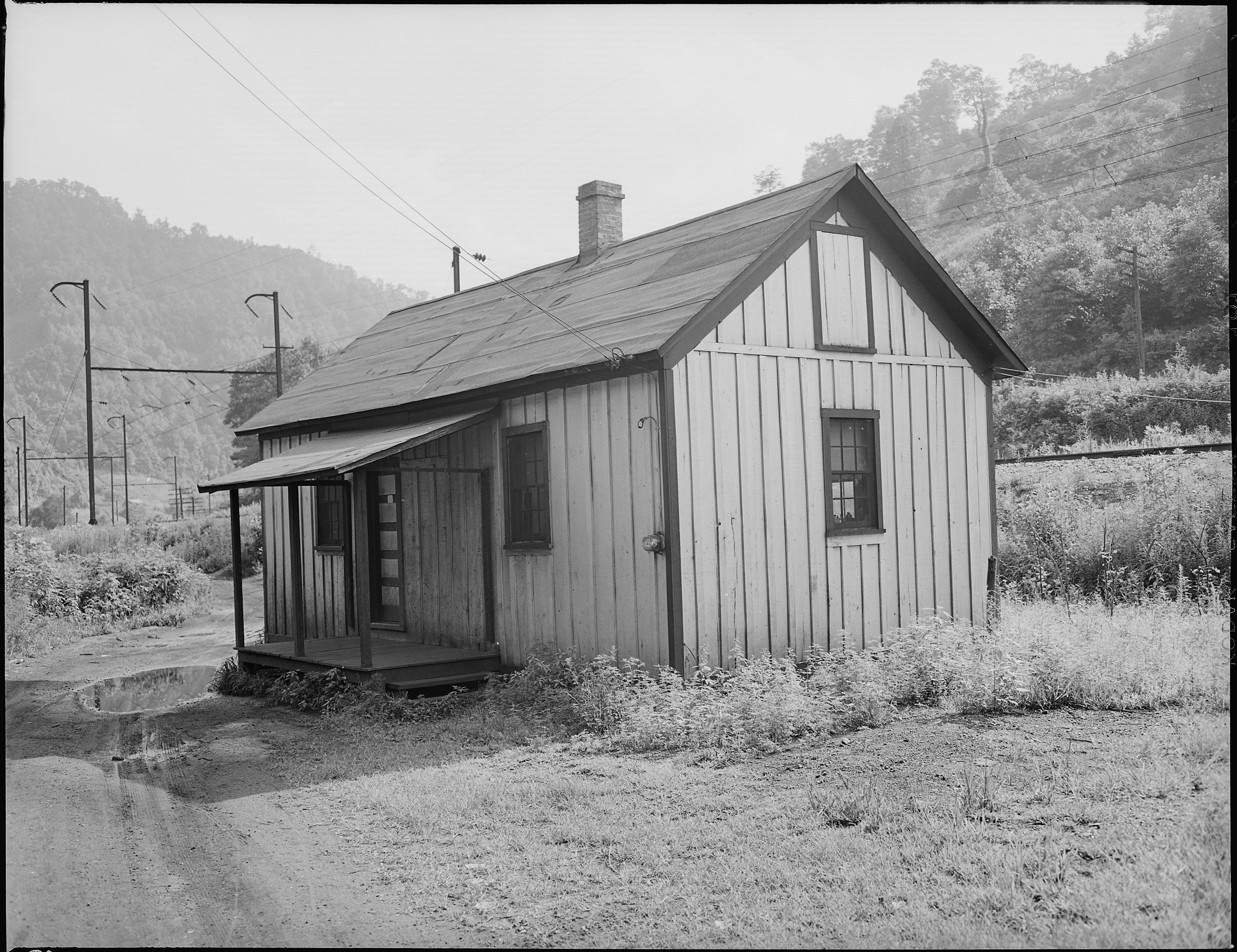
Doctor's office. The doctor for this camp is hired by Dr. Anderson, head doctor for the Kingston Pocahontas Coal Company, locally. Since the strike Dr. Anderson has cut off all funds for cleaning of this office. Kingston Pocahontas Coal Company, Exeter Mine, Welch, McDowell County, West Virginia, 10 August 1946

1946 (United States)
Bituminous Coal Strike of 1946 occurred.

1946 (United States)
Electrical Manufacturing Strike occurred.

1946 (United States)
General Motors Strike occurred.

1946 (United States)
Pittsburgh Power Strike occurred.

1946 (United States)
Railroad Strike occurred.

1946 (United States)
Steel Strike of 1946 occurred.

1 April 1946 (United States)
A strike by 400,000 mine workers in the U.S. began. U.S. troops seized railroads and coal mines the following month.

4 October 1946 (United States)
The U.S. Navy seized oil refineries in order to break a 20-state post-war strike.

1947 (United States)
Taft–Hartley Act passed by U.S. Congress. The Act restricted union practices and permitted states to ban union security agreements.

1947 (United States)
R.J. Reynolds Tobacco Company Strike occurred.

1947 (United States)
Telephone Strike occurred.

20 June 1947 (United States)
The Taft–Hartley Act, curbing strikes, was vetoed by President Truman. Congress overrode the veto.

1948 (United States)
Progressive Party founded.

20 April 1948 (United States)
Labor leader Walter Reuther was shot and seriously wounded by would-be assassins.

1949 (International)
International Confederation of Free Trade Unions splits from the World Federation of Trade Unions

1949 (United States)
Congress of Industrial Organizations expelled two unions for alleged communist influence.

1949 (United States)
Hawaii Dock Strike occurred.

== 1950s ==
1950 (United States)
Congress of Industrial Organizations expelled nine unions for alleged communist influence.

1950 (United States)
United Auto Workers and General Motors reached agreement on a contract that provided pensions and wage increases over the duration of the signed contract.

1950 (United States)
Salt of the Earth Strike of New Mexico began.

1950 (International)
The Freedom of Association and Protection of the Right to Organise Convention, 1948, one of the two primary labor conventions of the ILO, came into force on 4 July.

27 August 1950 (United States)
President Truman ordered the U.S. Army to seize all the nation's railroads to prevent a general strike. The railroads were not returned to their owners until two years later.

1951 (International)
The Right to Organise and Collective Bargaining Convention, 1949, one of the two primary labor conventions of the ILO, came into force on 18 July.

1952 (United States)
George Meany is elected president of the American Federation of Labor.

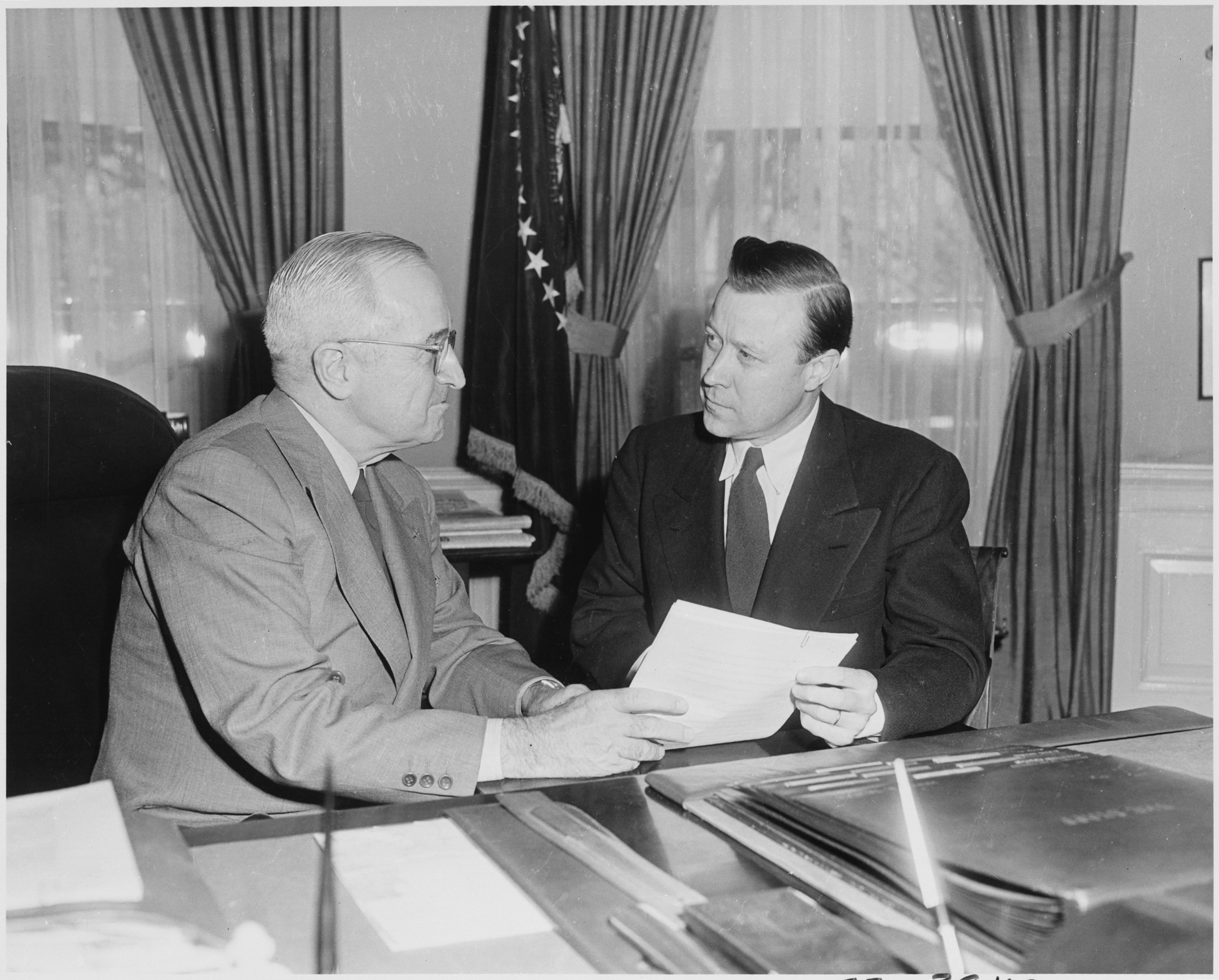
Photograph of President Truman in the Oval Office, conferring with labor leader Walter Reuther, president of the Congress of Industrial Organizations, 1952 December 12.

1952 (United States)
Walter Reuther is elected president of the Congress of Industrial Organizations.

1952 (United States)
Steel Strike occurred.

8 April 1952 (United States)
President Truman ordered the U.S. Army to seize the nation's steel mills to avert a strike. The act was ruled to be illegal by the Supreme Court on 2 June.

1953 (United States)
American Federation of Labor and the Congress of Industrial Organizations reached an agreement to not raid from each other's membership.

1953 (United States)
American Federation of Labor expelled the International Longshoremen's Union on grounds of corruption.

1953 (United States)
Louisiana Sugar Cane Workers' Strike occurred.

1954 (United States)
Kohler Strike occurred.

1955 (United States)
United Auto Workers successfully negotiate with Ford Motor Company for supplementary unemployment benefits.

1955 (United States)
Southern Telephone Strike occurred.

April 1955 (United States)
Textile workers strike of 1955, in both New Bedford and Fall River, Massachusetts. Strike over a nickel raise was led and negotiated by Union President Manuel "Manny" Fernandes Jr., who resolved the strike and got the workers a nickel raise.

5 December 1955 (United States)
The two largest labor organizations in the U.S. merged to form the AFL–CIO, with a membership estimated at 15 million. George Meany served as the first president of the combined organization.

1956 (United States)
East Coast Longshoremen's Strike occurred.

1956 (United States)
Steel Strike of 1956 occurred.

April 1956 (Canada)
The largest Canadian trade union center, the Canadian Labour Congress (CLC), was formed.

5 April 1956 (United States)
Columnist Victor Riesel, a crusader against labor racketeers, was blinded in New York City when a hired assailant threw sulfuric acid in his face.

1957 (United States)
American Federation of Labor and Congress of Industrial Organizations expelled International Brotherhood of Teamsters, Bakery Workers, and Laundry Workers on the grounds of corruption.

1959 (United States)
U.S. Congress passed the Labor Management Reporting and Disclosure Act.

1959 (United States)
Steel strike of 1959 occurred.

14 September 1959 (United States)
The Landrum–Griffin Act passes, restricting union activity.

7 November 1959 (United States)
The Taft–Hartley Act is invoked by the Supreme Court to break a steel strike.

== 1960s ==
1960 (United States)
Negro American Labor Council founded.

1960 (United States)
General Electric Strike occurred.

1960 (United States)
Seamen's Strike occurred.

1962 (United States)
President John F Kennedy issues Executive Order 10988 establishing limited collective bargaining rights for federal employees and widely regarded as the impetus for the expansion of public sector bargaining rights at state and local levels in the years to come.

1962 (United States)
1962 New York City newspaper strike began.

1962 (United States)
East Coast Longshoremen's Strike began.

1 April 1963 (United States)
The 1962 New York City newspaper strike, longest newspaper strike in U.S. history ended. The 9 major newspapers in New York City had ceased publication over 114 days before.

10 June 1963 (United States)
Congress passed the Equal Pay Act mandating equal pay to women.

1965 (United States)
United Farm Workers Organizing Committee founded.

1965 (United States)
California Grape Workers' Strike occurred.

1966 (United States)
New York Transportation Strike occurred.

27 August–2 September 1966 (Canada)
Nationwide rail transportation strike occurred.

1967 (United States)
Copper Strike started.

1968 (United States)
Members of four railroad unions voted overwhelmingly for the largest union merger ever in the railroad industry. The merger created a powerful new union called the United Transportation Union (UTU).

1968 (United States)
New York City Teachers' Strike occurred.

May 1968 (France)
What began as a student protest developed into a nationwide general strike.

1968 (International)
The ICFTU becomes the World Confederation of Labour

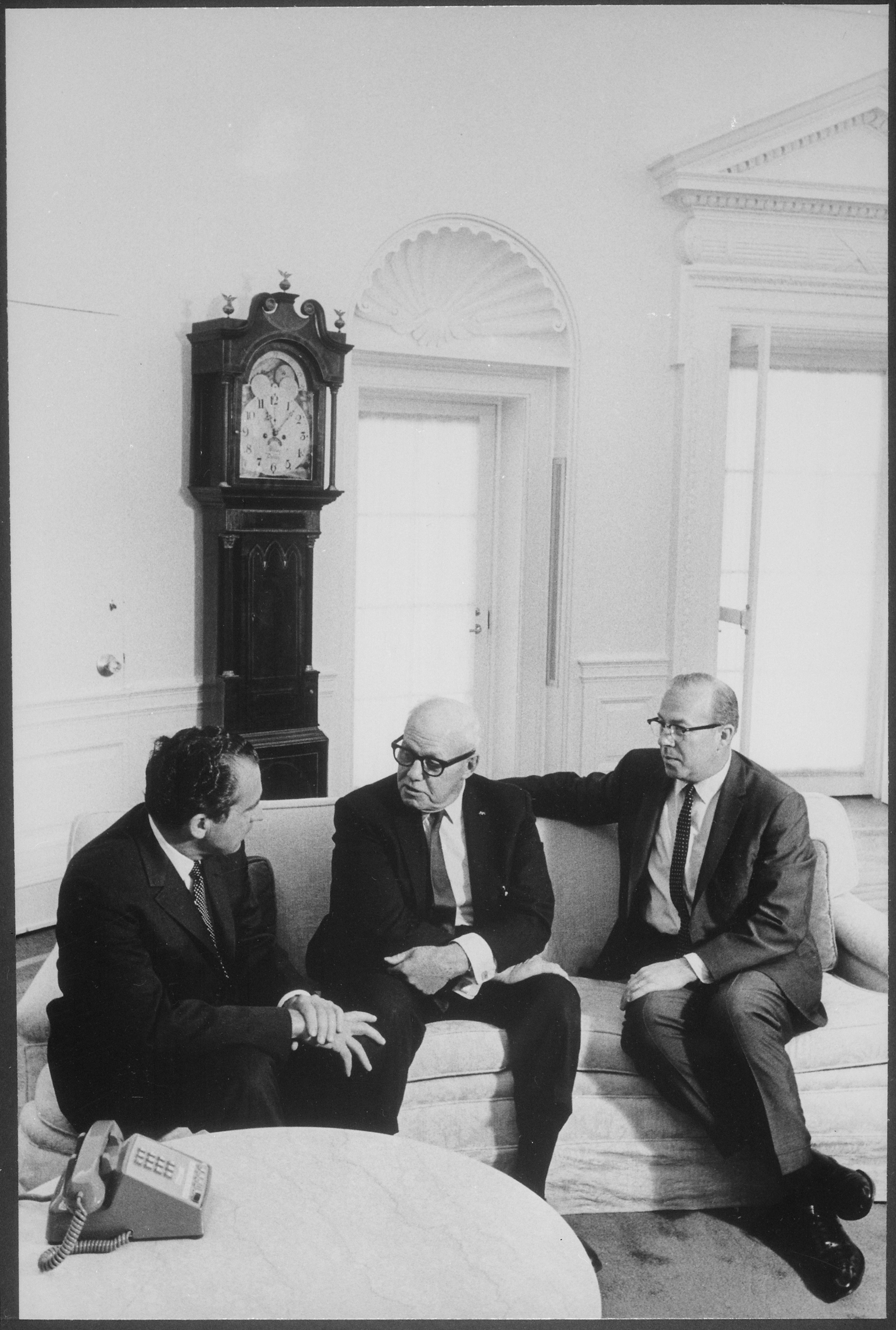
President Nixon with AFL–CIO President George Meany and Secretary of Labor George Shultz

1969 (United States)
Charleston, South Carolina, Hospital Workers' Strike occurred.

== 1970s ==
1970 (United States)
U.S. Congress enacted Occupational Safety and Health Act.

1970 (United States)
General Motors Strike occurred.

1970 (United States)
Postal Workers Strike occurred.

5 January 1970 (United States)
Joseph Yablonski, unsuccessful reform candidate to unseat W. A. Boyle as President of the United Mine Workers, was murdered, along with his wife and daughter, in their Clarksville, Pennsylvania home by assassins acting on Boyle's orders. Boyle was later convicted of the killing.

West Virginia miners went on strike the following day in protest.

18 March 1970 (United States)
The first mass work stoppage in the 195-year history of the United States Post Office Department began with a walkout of letter carriers in Brooklyn and Manhattan, soon involving 210,000 of the nation's 750,000 postal employees. With mail service virtually paralyzed in New York, Detroit, and Philadelphia, President Nixon declared a state of national emergency and assigned military units to New York City post offices. The stand-off culminated two weeks later.

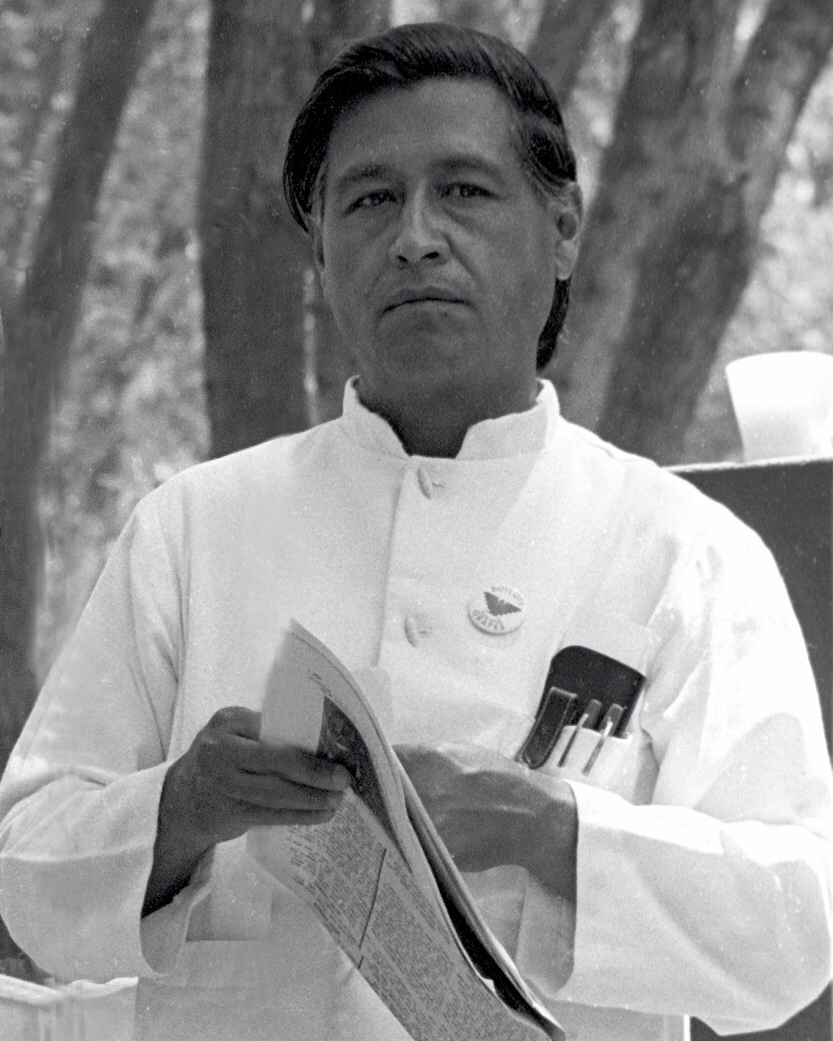
César Chávez, co founder of UFW

29 July 1970 (United States)
United Farm Workers forced California grape growers to sign an agreement after a five-year strike.

1971 (United Kingdom)
United Kingdom postal workers strike from 20 January to 7 March 1971.

1971 (United States)
New York City Police Strike occurred.
ILWU International Longshore and Warehouse Union Strike From 1 July 1971 to 20 February 1972

1972 (United States)
Farah Clothing Workers' Strike and Boycott occurred.

1972 (United States)
Lordstown, Ohio, Auto Workers' Strike occurred.

1972 (United States)
Philadelphia Teachers Strike started.

1974 (United States)
Coalition of Labor Union Women formed.

1974 (United States)
Employment Retirement Income Security Act passed by U.S. Congress.

1974 (United States)
Baltimore Police Strike occurred.

1975 (United States)
U.S. Congress voted down union-sponsored bill to reform the basic United States labor laws.

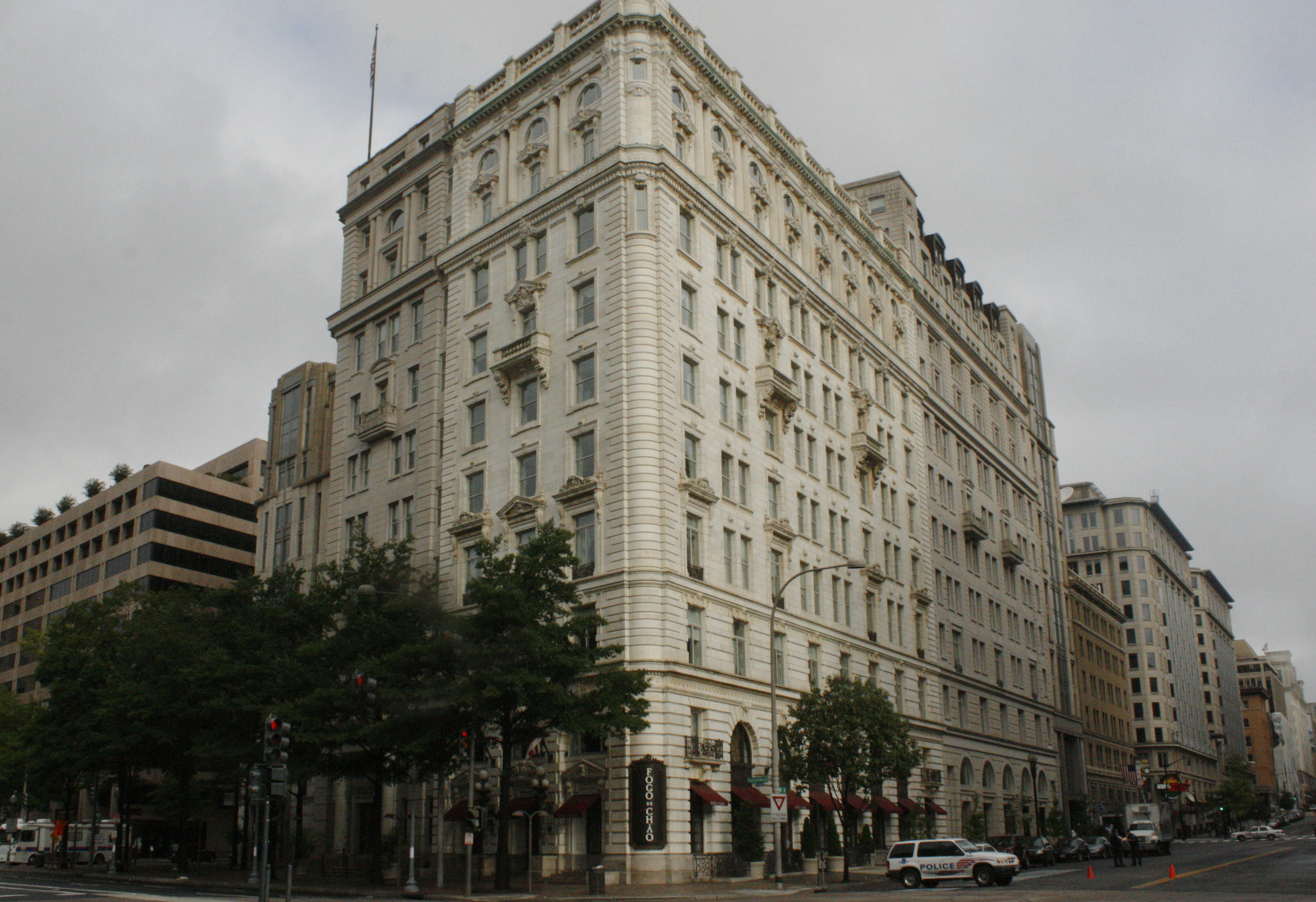
On 1 October 1975, press operators at the Post went on strike, severely damaging all printing presses before leaving the building

1 October 1975 (United States)
Washington Post Pressmen's Strike occurred.

1976 (United States)
U.S. Congress voted down union-sponsored bill to make it easier for construction unions to organize.

1977 (United States)
Bituminous Coal Strike of 1977–1978 started.

1977 (United States)
Coors Beer Strike and Boycott started.

1977 (United States)
J.P. Stevens Boycott began.

1977 (United States)
Willmar, Minnesota, Bank Workers' Strike began.

1978 (United States)
Wilkes-Barre, Pennsylvania Newspaper Strike began.

1978 (United States)
New York City newspaper strike, lasted 88 days.

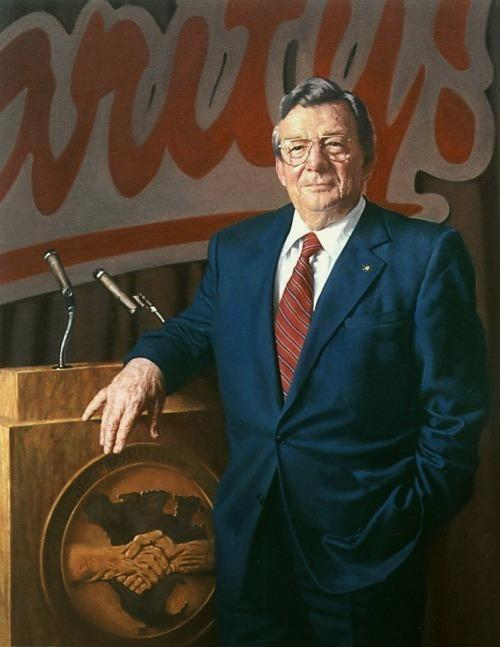
Portrait of Lane Kirkland by Richard Whitney

1979 (United States)
Lane Kirkland elected president of the AFL–CIO.

1979 (United States)
Independent Trucker Strike occurred.

1979 (United States)
The film Norma Rae, based on a real life character trying to unionize a textile mill, is released. It wins an Academy Award for best actress.

== 1980s ==
September 1980 (Poland)
The trade union Solidarity (Solidarność) is established at the Gdańsk Shipyard, and originally led by Nobel Peace Prize winner Lech Wałęsa. Within the year the government implements martial law in an attempt to quell nationwide civil unrest and protest.

1980 (United States)
Joyce Miller joined the AFL–CIO executive board as the first female board member.

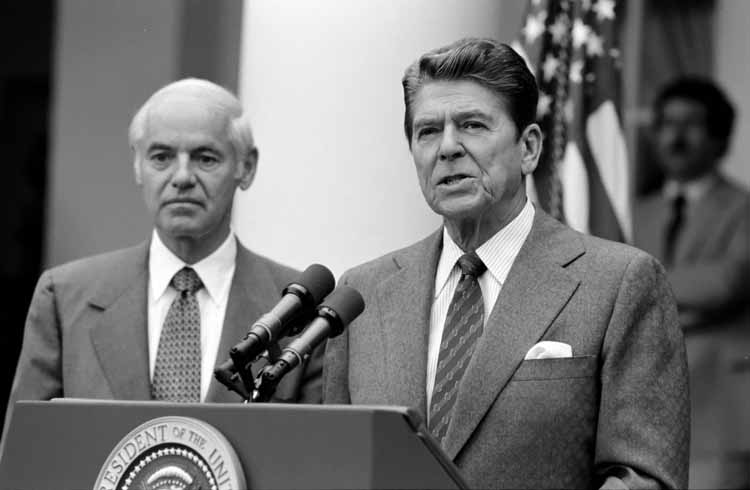
Reagan speaks on air traffic controllers strike 1981

3 August 1981 (United States)
Federal air traffic controllers began a nationwide strike after their union rejected the government's final offer for a new contract. Most of the 13,000 striking controllers defied the back-to-work order, and were dismissed by President Reagan on 5 August. Reagan ordered them to leave.

Largest labor rally in United States history broke out in protest of Reagan's order.

1981 (United States)
Baseball Players' Strike occurred.

October 1982 (United States)
A boycott was initiated by the International Association of Machinists (IAM) against Brown & Sharpe. The National Labor Relations Board later charged Brown & Sharpe with regressive bargaining, and of entering into negotiations with the express purpose of not reaching an agreement with the union. (See IAM for more details.).

1983 (United States)
Phelps-Dodge Copper Strike commenced.

1984 (United States)
Yale University Clerical Workers' Strike began.

1985 (United States)
Hormel Meatpackers' Strike occurred but ultimately failed.

1985 (United States)
Los Angeles County Sanitation Strike occurred.

1985 (United States)
Yale University Clerical Workers' Strike ended.

1985 (Vatican City)
The Association of Vatican Lay Workers was formed, but was not recognized by the Vatican authorities until 1993. It is the sole trade union in Vatican City and represents the majority of the 3000 employees who work in the city state.

1986 (United States)
Trans World Airlines Flight Attendants' Strike occurred.

1986 (United States)
USX (United States Steel) Lockout occurred.

6 October 1986 (United States)
Female flight attendants won an 18-year lawsuit against United Airlines, which had fired them for getting married. The lawsuit was resolved when a U.S. district court approved the reinstatement of 475 attendants and $37 million back-pay settlement for 1,725 flight attendants. (United Airlines, Inc. v. McDonald, 432 U.S. 385 (1977))

1987 (United States)
Paperworkers' Strike and Lockout began.

1987 (United States)
Professional Football Players' Strike occurred.

1988 (United Kingdom)
United Kingdom postal workers strike from 31 August to 13 September 1988.

1989 (United States)
Eastern Airlines Workers' Strike occurred.

1989 (United States)
Pittston Coal Company Mine Workers' Strike occurred.

4 April 1989 (Poland)
Round table negotiations between Solidarity and the then-Communist government result in semi-free parliamentary elections in Poland, a pivotal moment in fall of the Iron Curtain in Eastern Europe. Solidarity leader Lech Wałęsa is elected President in August of that year.

== 2000s ==
14 January 2003 (United States)
20,000 employees at 48 plants in 33 states struck against General Electric, the first strike against GE in 33 years, over a plan to shift more health care costs to employees and retirees.

2006 (International)
The World Confederation of Labour merges with the International Confederation of Free Trade Unions and eight other trade union affiliations to found the International Trade Union Confederation.

== 2010s ==
2012 (United States)

Coke workers of the Fossil Creek Facility (in Fort Worth) vote 215 to 191 to not be represented by The International Brotherhood of Teamsters.

2018 (China)

Jasic incident occurred. Workers led by Maoist students made several walkouts, many were arrested thereafter.

2019 (United States)

2019 General Motors Strike occurred. 48,000 United Auto Workers representing Detroit GM factory employees went on strike from 15 September to 25 October to demand healthcare coverage, higher wages, increased job security, and gateway for temporary workers to become permanent.

== 2020s ==
2021 (United States)

Starbucks workers voted to unionize three stores in Buffalo, New York, two of which are now recognized by the NLRB as Starbucks Workers United.

Chris Smalls founded the Amazon Labor Union in New York City.

2022 (United States)

Graduate student workers at MIT vote to organize with UE.

2023 (United States)

UAW workers strike against the Big Three automotive companies, Ford, General Motors, and Stellantis, in Detroit, Michigan.

== See also ==
Asia:

- Labor unions in Japan

Europe

- European Trade Union Confederation
- Trade unions in the United Kingdom

North America:

- List of US labor strikes by size
- Labor unions in the United States
- List of worker deaths in United States labor disputes
- Timeline of labour issues and events in Canada

International:

- Industrial Workers of the World
- International Trade Union Confederation
- World Federation of Trade Unions
- International Workers' Association
- IndustriALL Global Union
- International Confederation of Labor
- International comparisons of trade unions

General:

- List of strikes
- Opposition to trade unions
- Labour law
