= Buffalo switchmen's strike =

Railroad strike

- Date: August 12–25, 1892
- Location: Buffalo, New York
- Caused by: New York statute requiring minimum wage increases and limiting switchmen's days to 10 hours of work
- Goals: To force railroad companies to comply with the NY law
- Methods: Strike action
- Result: railroad companies blacklisted strikers

Parties
Switchmen's Mutual Association	Lehigh Valley Railroad, Erie Railroad and Buffalo Creek Railroad

Number
	+8,000 NY State Guardsmen

The Buffalo switchmen's strike was a two-week strike in August 1892 by railroad workers employed by three railroads in Buffalo, New York. The strike collapsed after two weeks when 8,000 state militia entered the town and other unions refused to support the workers.

== Events of the strike ==
In early 1892, the New York state legislature passed a law mandating a 10-hour work-day and increases in the day- and night-time minimum wage. Switchmen in Buffalo were members of the Switchmen's Mutual Association, a national union with about 15,000 members. On August 12, switchmen in the Buffalo railyards struck the Lehigh Valley Railroad, the Erie Railroad and the Buffalo Creek Railroad after the companies refused to obey the new law. Violence quickly broke out. On August 13, a number of abandoned rail cars were set on fire. The Buffalo police, sympathetic to the workers' cause, refused to help the railroads break the strike. On August 14, additional rail cars outside the city limits were set ablaze. The sheriff of Erie County swore in a number of special deputies but was unable to stop the arson. (Note: The union publicly asserted that none of its members had set fire to the rail cars. It remains unclear whether union members or local hooligans committed the various acts of arson.)

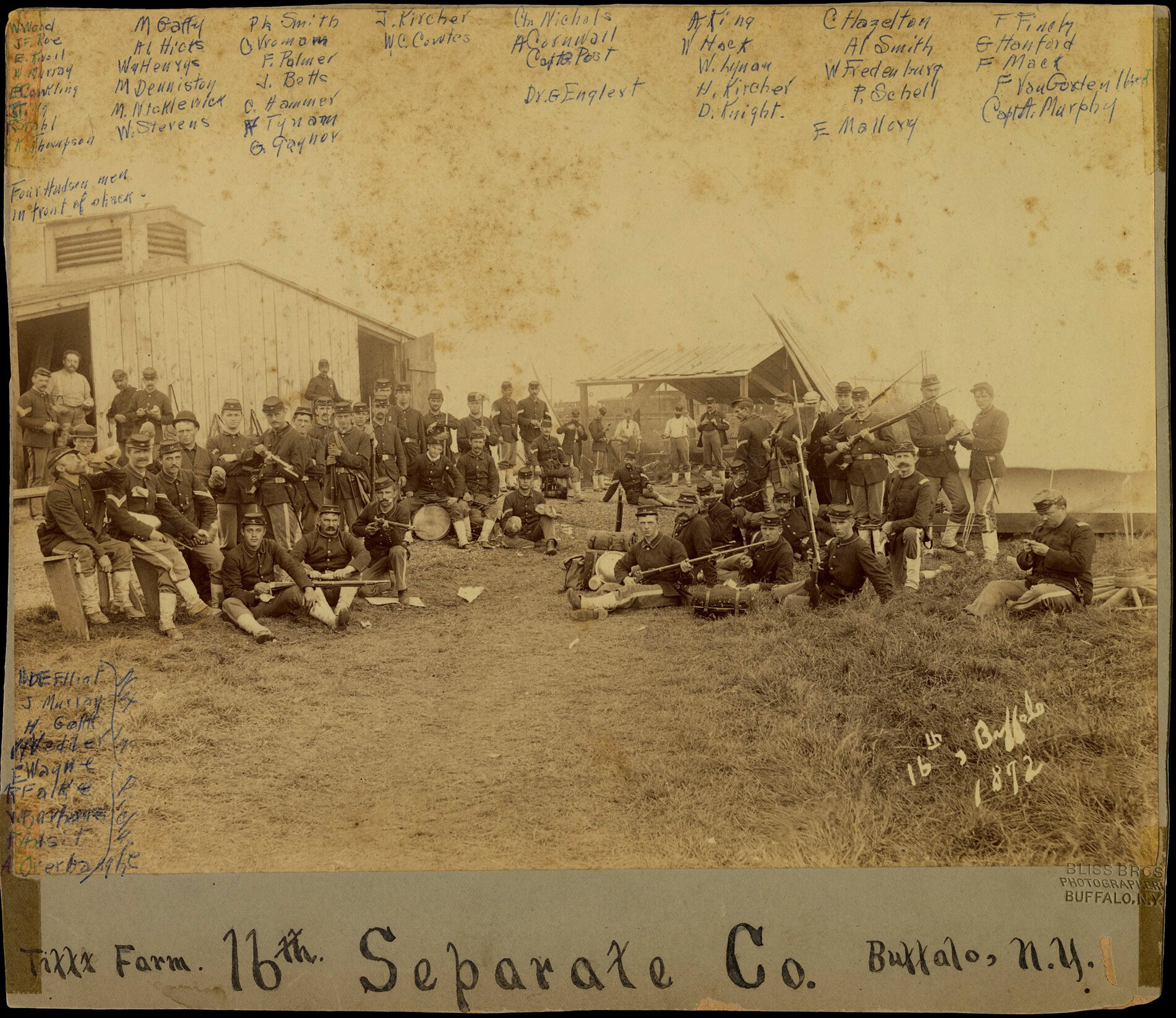
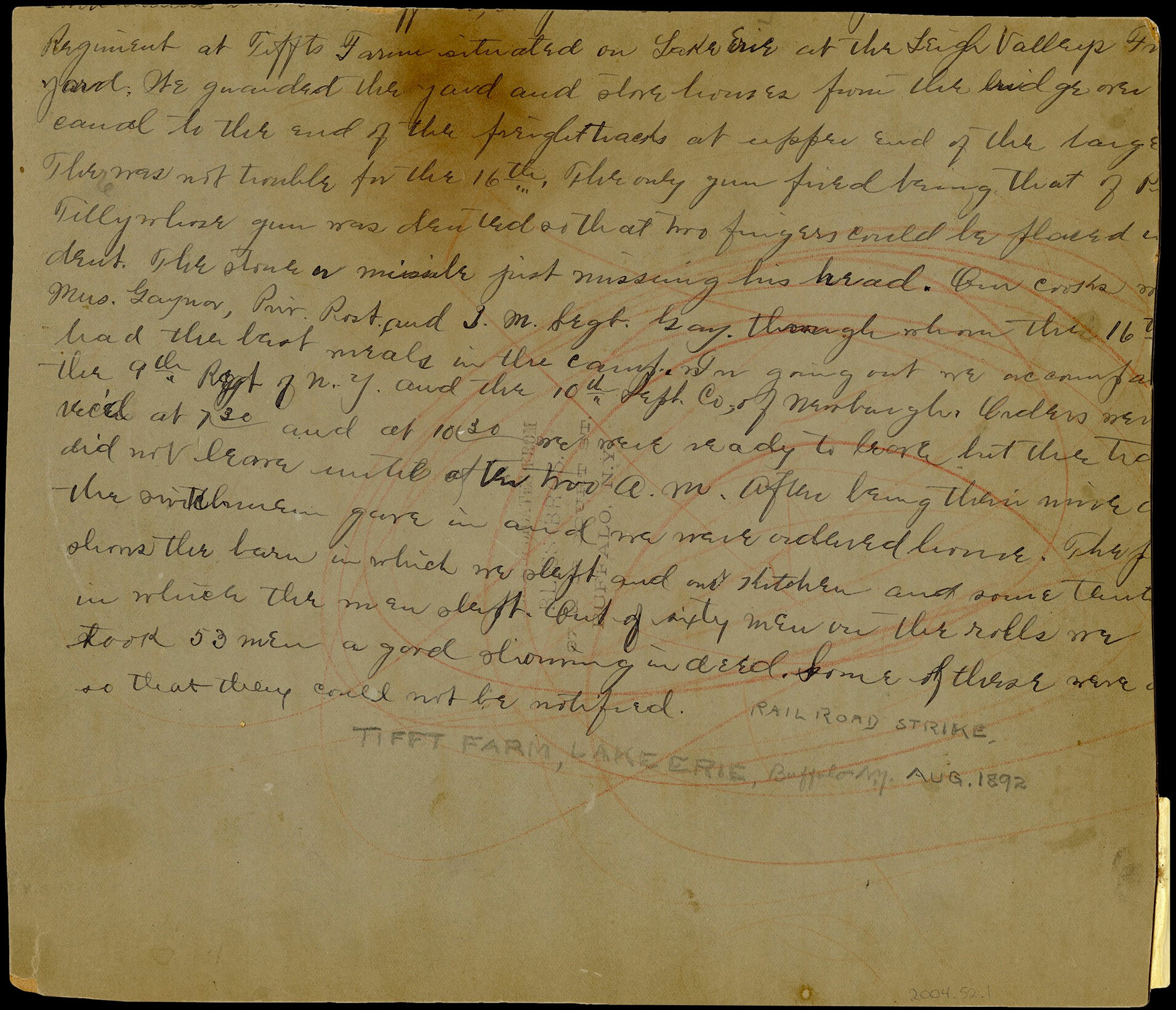
National Guard called to stop strike.
Tifft Farm, 16th Separate Co. Buffalo, N.Y. August 1892

On August 15, Democratic Governor Roswell P. Flower called out the New York State Guard to restore order and protect the railroads' property. However, State Guard Brigadier General Peter C. Doyle, commanding the Fourth Brigade, held a full-time position as an agent of the Lehigh Valley Railroad and was determined to crush the strike. Even though more than 8,000 soldiers invested the town, violence continued. As the 65th Regiment detrained 200 soldiers at a Buffalo train station on August 15, an unmanned train loaded with explosives steamed through the station. The explosives detonated, wounding three soldiers. Guard commanders soon found that many railroad tracks in the city had been mined. When trains passed over the tracks, the pressure of the train on the tracks set off the bombs. The striking switchmen claimed that they had not engaged in arson, and that the rail cars which had burned were abandoned. But Gen. Doyle refused to accept either claim. He ordered dozens of strikers imprisoned, and encouraged his troops to deal harshly with any workers who interfered, or seemed about to interfere, with the keeping of the peace.

The strike began to collapse. The railroads brought in hundreds of strikebreakers. Striking switchmen were beaten by troops and Erie County sheriff's deputies. Troops broke up mass meetings, clubbing workers with the butts of their rifles. The violence led switchmen on the New York, Chicago and St. Louis Railroad (known by the pronunciation of its acronym as the 'Nickel Plate') and the New York Central Railroad to strike in sympathy. The leaders of the switchmen's union called on other railroad unions to engage in a general strike in support of their job action. The president of the Switchmen's Mutual Association called the heads of the Order of Railway Conductors, the Brotherhood of Locomotive Firemen and the Brotherhood of Railway Trainmen to Buffalo for a meeting. But the August 23 conference was brief: The other unions refused to take their members out on strike. Unable to fight both soldiers and scabs without help, the switchmen ended their strike on August 25, 1892. The switchmen agreed to return to work, but the railroads blacklisted most of the workers.

== Impact of the strike ==
Prior to the Buffalo switchmen's strike, most railroad unions in the United States did not engage in consultation and coordination in order to increase their collective bargaining power. Attempts in 1886 and 1889 to form a federation of rail unions quickly collapsed. But the defeat of the Buffalo switchmen's union proved to be a powerful lesson in labor unity. Eugene V. Debs, national secretary of the Locomotive Firemen, resigned his position a month after the switchmen's strike in order to work full-time on the creation of a national union of railway workers. Debs was successful in forming the American Railway Union (ARU) in June 1893. But the ARU would prove to be short-lived. The union was crushed in the violent Pullman strike of 1894. The union's collapse pushed Debs toward Socialism.

The Pullman strike also convinced many in the American labor movement that the government was a tool of corporate interests, and that they could no longer openly oppose large corporations. The Pullman strike caused a conservative shift in the American Federation of Labor from which the labor body has not emerged.
