= Switchmen's Mutual Aid Association =

- Founded: March 2, 1886
- Dissolved: July 1894
- Location(s): US and Canada

The Switchmen's Mutual Aid Association of North America (SMAA) was a 19th-century fraternal benefit society and trade union in the United States of America. Its members included the operators of railway track switches and those who coupled train cars in railway yards. Organized in 1886, the union came to its demise in July 1894 with rise of the American Railway Union and the smashing defeat it was delivered in the 1894 Pullman Strike. The organization was succeeded in October 1894 with the establishment of the Switchmen's Union of North America.

== History ==
=== Establishment ===
James L. Monaghan, first grand master of the SMAA.

The first trade union of American railway switchmen was a local organization founded in the city of Chicago during the tumultuous labor struggles of 1877. In June of that year James Cullerton, a switchman for the Lake Shore & Michigan Southern Railway, sent word to the various rail yards of the city asking for three delegates from each to be dispatched to an organizational meeting. A total of 15 delegates showed up for the meeting, which launched a short-lived organization called the Switchmen's Brotherhood. This was supplanted by a new organization on August 18 of the same year called the Switchmen's Union, with Cullerton again playing a leading role. This organization continued in existence at least through 1881, failing to expand outside of Chicago but nevertheless providing a nucleus for development of a future union.

Cullerton's pioneering effort finally saw growth in 1884 with increased local membership and activity in Chicago and expansion of the concept to other local organizations in railroad cities in the Midwest.

These autonomous local Switchmen's Unions began to feel the need for a national organization and a call was issued for a founding convention, to be held February 22, 1886, in Chicago. A well-attended organizational convention lasting 8 days followed, with the body electing officers, establishing a monthly magazine, and carrying on extensive discussions in secret session.

A follow-up convention was scheduled to begin September 20, 1886, in Kansas City, Missouri. This gathering was known as the First Annual Convention of the SMAA and was attended by delegates from 25 lodges affiliated with the organization. The main business of the gathering was consumed in the writing of a constitution and bylaws for the governance of the organization. James L. Monaghan, a graduate of the Philadelphia school system who had studied law for two years, was elected the first Grand Master of the organization. Monaghan would be elected to the Illinois State Legislature in November 1888, to be succeeded as head of the SMAA by Minneapolis resident Frank Sweeney.

The Second Annual Convention of the SMAA was gaveled to order September 19, 1887, in Indianapolis. The gathering was noteworthy for its elevation of another mainstay of the SMAA to prominence when it elected 26-year old Chicago native William A. Simsrott as Grand Secretary and Treasurer of the organization. Together with Sweeney, Vice Grand Master John Downey, and Switchman's Magazine editor John A. Hall, these would comprise the top leaders of the SMAA during its comparatively brief existence.

=== Chicago, Burlington & Quincy strike of 1888 ===
Throughout the 19th and much of the 20th Century, railway workers were divided into innumerable subdivisions based upon craft, with the engineers participating in the Brotherhood of Locomotive Engineers (B of LE), the firemen who broke and shoveled coal to fuel the trains part of the Brotherhood of Locomotive Firemen (B of LF), the conductors part of the Order of Railway Conductors (ORC), the brake operators part of the Brotherhood of Railroad Brakemen (BRB), and so forth. The SMAA was part of this myriad of organizations — a diffusion of decision-making authority and range of competing institutional interests which made unity of action during strikes extremely difficult.

In January 1888, disaffected engineers of the B of LE and firemen of the B of LF who were part of the Chicago, Burlington & Quincy (CB&Q) system of lines came together to discuss joint action against their employer — which they perceived as abusive — with respect to wages, job security (requiring cause for termination), job classification, and work conditions. A negotiating committee was appointed, which presented the unions' case to railway officials, who declined to make any substantive changes.

Heads of the two organizations, Grand Chief Peter M. Arthur of the B of LE and Grand Master Frank P. Sargent of the B of LF were called in and together with a reorganized negotiating team further meetings were conducted with the railway still unwilling to increase wages or to alter working conditions. Final appeals to the General Manager and President of the railway were similarly unproductive. A strike was called.

At 4 pm on February 27, 1888, all locomotives of the CB&Q system were delivered to their terminal points and all engineers and firemen of the railway walked off the job and a protracted strike was begun. Shortly after the beginning of the strike, the CB&Q began to move its cars via other parallel railways. A meeting was held in Chicago on March 5 between the two striking organizations, at which it was agreed that the engineers and firemen of these parallel lines should notify their employers that while they would continue to perform all of their other duties, they would henceforth no longer handle CB&Q cars on the trains which they operated.

Strikebreakers were hired by the railway in order to keep the line open, many of whom had little railway experience, making the already dangerous job of coupling and uncoupling cars performed by switchmen in the yards and on the sidings even more deadly. Consequently, the strike against the CB&Q was joined on March 23 by the members of the SMAA. The railway brakemen remained on the job, however, helping to operate the trains of the CB&Q while the three brotherhoods of the running trades were on strike, although the level ill feeling on the part of striking engineers, firemen, and switchmen towards the brakemen was said to be comparatively small.

The strike was ultimately lost by the unions, lending to a general sense of unease with the efficacy of the diffused craft form of labor organization.

=== Federation efforts ===
Members of the SMAA, Lodge No. 116 (Kensington, Illinois) during a holiday celebration in the early 1890s.

During the summer and fall of 1888, following the loss of the Chicago, Burlington & Quincy strike, officials of the Brotherhood of Locomotive Firemen and the Switchmen's Mutual Aid Association began discussions intended to bring about a broad and permanent federation of the brotherhoods of the rolling crafts — engineers, firemen, switchmen, brakemen, and conductors. Articles of confederation were adopted between the two groups.

In February 1889, officers of the extremely pro-federation B of LF, including Grand Master Frank Sargent and Grand Secretary-Treasurer and magazine editor Eugene V. Debs met in Philadelphia to explore an even broader labor alliance, engaging in discussions with representatives of the venerable Knights of Labor (KoL) and the fledgling American Federation of Labor (AF of L) with a view to uniting workers in the railroad industry with the wider population of organized American workers.

It was not long until Sargent and Debs' work bore fruit, however, when on June 6, 1898, a new railway federation was established in Chicago called the Supreme Council of the United Orders of Railway Employees. Charter brotherhoods in this organization included the Brotherhood of Locomotive Firemen, the Brotherhood of Railway Brakemen, and the Switchmens' Mutual Aid Association. The two leading brotherhoods, organizations of the comparatively highly paid railway conductors and engineers, chose to stand aside from this new organizing effort.

The Supreme Council was a top-down organization, which centralized the authority of the executive officers of the railway brotherhoods and to thus make possible countervailing power against the centralized railroad systems, united in their own associations, the American Railway Association (ARA) and the General Managers' Association (GMA), established in 1885 and 1886, respectively.

== See also ==
- Switchman
- Switchmen's Union of North America
- American Railway Union
- United Transportation Union

== Official website ==
- Switchmen's Journal — Vol. 1 (1886-87) | Vol. 2 (1887–88) | Vol. 3 (1888–89) | Vol. 4 (1889–90) | Vol. 5 (1890–91) | Vol. 6 (1891–92) | Vol. 7 (1892–93) | Vol. 8 (1893–94) | Vol. 9 (1894) — Note: No copies known to exist for vols. 2, 3, 5, and 6.
