= Switchmen's Union of North America =

- Predecessor: Switchmen's Mutual Aid Association
- Merged: United Transportation Union
- Founded: October 13, 1894
- Dissolved: January 1, 1969
- Headquarters: Buffalo, New York
- Location: International
- Affiliations: American Federation of Labor

The Switchmen's Union of North America (SUNA) was a labor union formed in October 1894 that represented the track switch operators and people who coupled railway cars in railway yards in the United States and Canada. It became part of the United Transportation Union in 1969.

== Precursors ==
The origins of the union can be traced to August 1870 when a local switchmen's mutual aid association was formed in Chicago. At that time, switchmen were paid $50 a week for twelve hour days, seven days a week. The association was formed to help them bargain for better conditions.

The Switchmen's Mutual Aid Association of North America was organized in 1877 and held its first meeting in 1886. The national association suffered from a lockout by the Chicago and North Western Railway and the failed Burlington Railroad Strike of 1888 against the Chicago, Burlington and Quincy Railroad. In 1889 it was affiliated with the Supreme Council of United Orders of Railway Employees.

Although blacks were widely employed by the railroads after the American Civil War, particularly in the south, they were generally excluded from the higher-paying jobs of engineers, switchmen and conductors. In 1887 white switchmen staged a walkout in protest against working with blacks in the Southern Pacific Railroad yard at Houston, and were supported by white switchmen from the Houston and Texas Central Railroad. In 1890 the white switchmen quit when the company refused to fire black workers at the yard. The Brotherhood of Railroad Trainmen, Brotherhood of Railroad Conductors, Switchmen's Mutual Aid Association and Brotherhood of Locomotive Firemen formed a joint committee that submitted a protest:

Article 1–The mere fact of negroes being employed in train, yard and locomotive departments of this company is causing many of our most worthy members to leave the service. ... We term it an injustice to subject us to an association which is directly antagonistic to our organization and taste. Therefore, we earnestly request that all negroes employed in train, yard and locomotive departments of the Houston and Texas Central Railroad system be removed and white men employed in their stead.

The company refused to accept this demand. They continued to employ blacks as they had in the past, in part because they accepted lower wages. As the Houston Daily Post noted, the railroad owned slaves before emancipation, and continued to employ negroes afterward. "Negro labor was and is the ordinary labor of the country." The Buffalo switchmen's strike was a two-week strike in August 1892 by railroad workers employed by three railroads in Buffalo, New York. The strike collapsed after two weeks when 8,000 state militia entered the town and other unions refused to support the workers. The Switchmen's Mutual Aid Association was dissolved in 1894.

== Foundation ==
On October 13, 1894, delegates from several lodges of the former association met in Kansas City, Missouri and formed the Switchmen's Union of North America. It was incorporated in Buffalo, New York on January 9, 1902, covering the United States and Canada, and representing yard workers: yardmasters, switchmen, switch tenders, towermen and interlocking men. The objectives were to promote the social, moral and intellectual interests of its members, to maintain harmonious relations between workers and employers and to protect its distressed or erring members, exercising its beneficial influence in the interests of right and justice. At this period, railway unions such as the Switchmen's Union avoided strikes wherever possible.

The organization had a central Grand lodge headed by a president, six vice-presidents as organizers, a secretary-treasurer, an editor and an elected five-person board of directors. It held a triennial convention to enact legislation and elect general officers. It was open to any white male person of good character working in the railway yards in one of the defined occupations. It published the Journal of the Switchmen's Union. The head office was in Buffalo.

The union offered life insurance and permanent disability benefits to its members. In 1901 more than two thirds of claims were related to work accidents. By 1914 the majority of benefits were paid to members who were sick or to the families of members who had died from natural clauses. Claims were forwarded by the local lodges to Buffalo for review by five-man beneficiary board. Typically it took two or three months before payment was made.

== History ==
In 1906 the union affiliated with the American Federation of Labor. SUNA was one of the founding unions of the Railway Labor Executives' Association in 1926. Discussions about a merger of train movement unions started in 1929 with the Brotherhood of Railroad Trainmen and the Order of Railway Conductors, but became bogged down. In 1935 SUNA affiliated with the Canadian Labour Congress.

In 1950 there were a series of disputes between the railroads and yard employees in connection with the 40-hour week. That year the government seized the railroads. The government's Railway Labor Act Emergency Board ruled on June 15, 1950, in favor of the 40-hour basic work week, overtime pay for work in excess of 40 hours, and other improvements. When the railroad owners rejected this John R. Steelman, the President's representative, defined a proposed settlement that included wage increases and cost of living adjustments. The Railroad Yardmasters of America, Railroad Yardmasters of North America and the Switchmen's Union of America agreed to settle with some railroads based on the Steelman formula effective October 1, 1950, but other operating unions held out.

By 1969 the Switchmen's Union of North America had 12,000 members in 275 lodges in the United States and Canada. That year it combined with the Brotherhood of Locomotive Firemen and Enginemen, Brotherhood of Railroad Trainmen and Order of Railway Conductors and Brakemen to form the United Transportation Union.
