= Charles Elliott Perkins =

American businessman

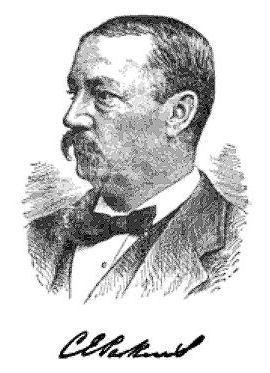
- Born: November 24, 1840; Cincinnati, Ohio, U.S.
- Died: November 8, 1907 (aged 66); Westwood, Massachusetts, U.S.
- Occupation: Railroad executive
- Known for: President, Chicago, Burlington and Quincy Railroad

Charles Elliott Perkins (November 24, 1840 – November 8, 1907) was an American businessman and president of the Chicago, Burlington and Quincy Railroad. He was so well respected that historian Richard Overton wrote, "From the time that Charles Elliott Perkins became vice president of the Chicago, Burlington and Quincy [1876] ... until he resigned as president in 1901, he was the Burlington."

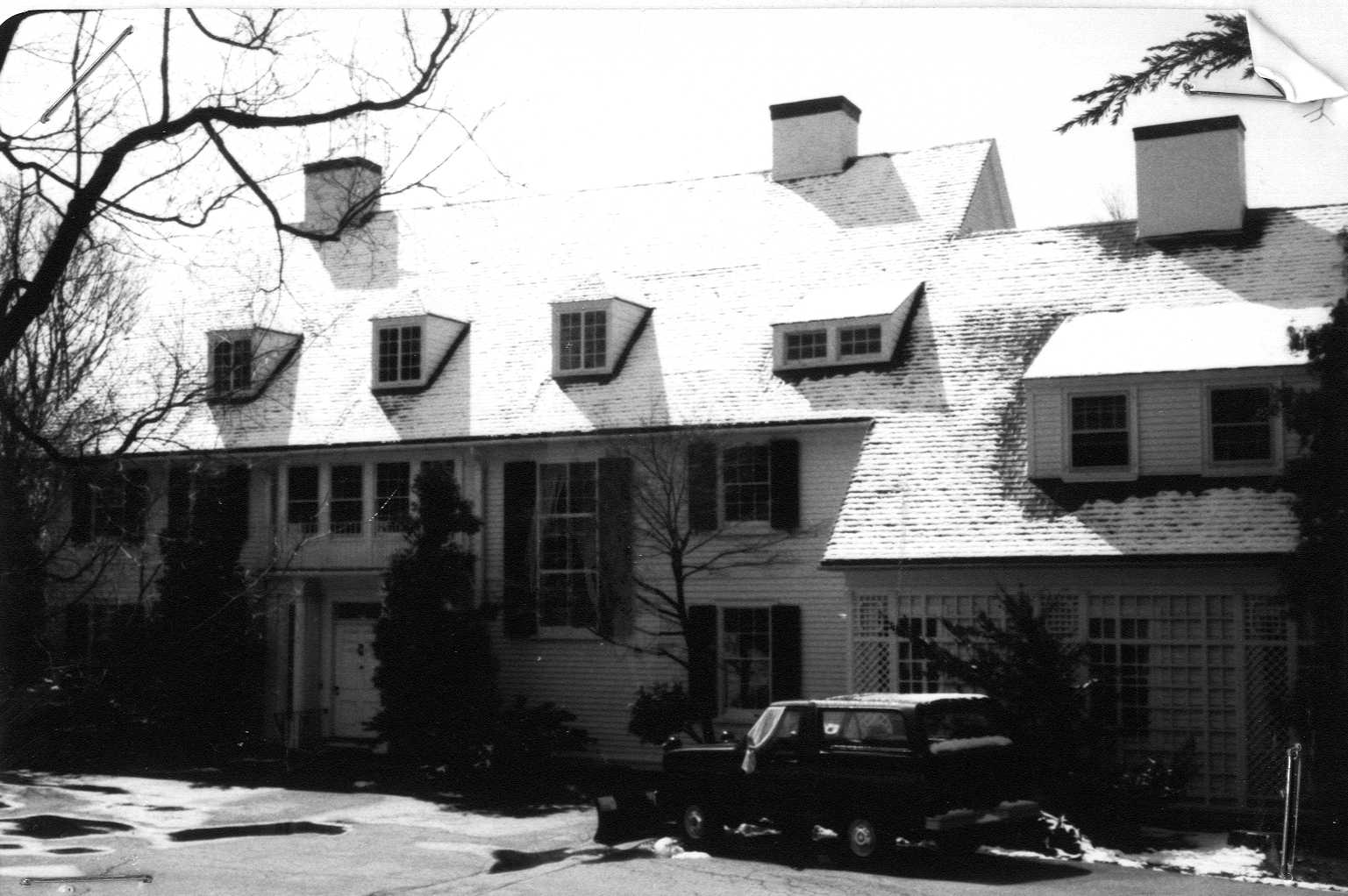
Perkins' Milton residence, designed by Peabody & Stearns

== Biography ==
=== Early life and career ===
He was born in Cincinnati, Ohio, on November 24, 1840, to James Handasyd and Sarah Hart (Elliott) Perkins. His ancestor was Pierre de Morlaix, bailiff at Malvern Chase (the large forest which was the favorite hunting ground of Edward I of England). His ancestor Edmund Perkins emigrated to Boston, Massachusetts, some time before 1677. His father, James Handasyd Perkins, was a noted Unitarian minister in Cincinnati. Charles was the oldest of five boys. He drowned (it may have been suicide) when Perkins was a child.

Charles Perkins was educated in the Cincinnati public schools, graduating from high school at the age of 16. He also received a portion of his education from Milton Academy in Milton, Massachusetts.

When he was 16 years old, he moved to Burlington, Iowa, where he won a job as a clerk in a fruit store. When he was 19 he took a job as a clerk for the Burlington and Missouri River Railroad (B&MR). He was promoted to paymaster a year later, and then at age 20 was made Assistant Treasurer of the railroad in 1860. His rapid rise in the company's ranks was not surprising: His uncle was John Murray Forbes, the railroad's president. He was named Acting Superintendent and then Superintendent of the line in 1865. At that time, the railroad extended a mere 75 miles (121 km), from Burlington to Ottumwa, Iowa.

He helped incorporate the Burlington and Missouri River's Nebraska division, and was named its director as well as director of the line's Iowa division. Perkins was appointed vice president of the Burlington and Missouri River Railroad in 1872. He was also named president of the B&MR's Nebraska division (a position he held until 1875). On January 1, 1873, the railroad merged with the Chicago, Burlington and Quincy (CB&Q), but he continued to hold the position of president of the Nebraska division. This proved a difficult economic time for the railroad. The Panic of 1873 set off the Long Depression, a prolonged period of deflation and little economic growth which did not end until after the Panic of 1893. During the first several years of the Long Depression, the CB&Q neither acquired nor built any new track, although the parent railroad did absorb its Iowa division.

=== Railroad vice presidency ===
Perkins was named to the board of directors of the CB&Q in 1875. In March 1876 he was named the company's vice president, but continued to hold the vice presidency and superintendency of the company's business operations west of the Missouri River. At this time, the CB&Q was part of the "Iowa Pool," a group of three railroads (the Chicago, Rock Island and Pacific Railroad ("the Rock"); Omaha and Northwestern Railroad (O&N); and the CB&Q) with major freight facilities in Omaha, Nebraska. At any given time, a single railroad might not have enough freight cars in Omaha to accommodate shippers. So they pooled their resources, and agreed to split the income from freight charges. The Iowa Pool was locked in a struggle with the Union Pacific Railroad. Profits depended on how much freight was handled, and which side could charge more. The Iowa Pool, which had more trains and track, could offer shippers a faster way across the Midwest (and charged higher prices accordingly). The CB&Q was the dominant system in the Pool. CB&Q president James Frederick Joy clashed with Perkins over the CB&Q's operations. Perkins wanted "his" railroad, the B&MR's Nebraska division, to carry traffic offered by the Union Pacific. But Joy would not allow it, wishing to force the Union Pacific to move freight via the Iowa Pool. Moreover, Joy owned a controlling interest in other small railroads which could also route traffic away from the Iowa Pool, and these lines were demanding that Joy stop inhibiting them. Forbes ousted Joy in 1875 and appointed Robert Harris as the CB&Q's new president—a move which led to Perkins' elevation to the road's vice presidency.

Although the CB&Q eventually purchased another minor railroad to enhance its position vis-á-vis the other small Nebraska railroads, Perkins came to believe that Jay Gould (majority stockholder in the Union Pacific) was using the lure of B&MR traffic to cause dissension within the Iowa Pool. In 1876, Perkins began lobbying Congress for legislation which would require railroads to charge shippers only for the actual miles traveled (a rule that would prevent the Union Pacific from charging higher rates, and thus drive it out of business). In 1876, Gould proposed that the Iowa Pool and Union Pacific jointly and perpetually lease the B&MR (depriving Perkins of his control over the road). Perkins and Forbes rejected the proposal, but Harris met with Gould and was so favorably impressed with the idea that he called for a meeting that would include Gould, Forbes, and Perkins. Meanwhile, Gould purchased enough stock on the Rock and O&N roads that he won a seat on their board of directors. Harris won over a majority of the CB&Q's board of directors, and Perkins did all he could to sabotage further negotiations. By June 1877, negotiations for the "Quintuple Contract" collapsed.

While Perkins was vice president of the B&MR, the Great Railroad Strike of 1877 occurred. Realizing public opinion was against the railroad and that support for the strike was widespread among workers, he shut down the railroad's operations on July 24 and demanded that the system's property be protected by "constitutional authorities". Within two days, public opinion turned against the strikers, and the strike began to collapse when conductors returned to work that day.

The fallout of the dispute with the Union Pacific led to a number of changes in the CB&Q. The CB&Q and B&MR became more closely allied, at the expense of the Iowa Pool. The Burlington was absorbed into the CB&Q in 1880. Perkins and Forbes then worked together to take over the Kansas City, St. Joseph and Council Bluffs Railroad and the Burlington and Southwestern Railway the same year. The Union Pacific was unable to reach an agreement with the Rock and O&N for more favorable freight charges. Instead, the Union Pacific reached an informal agreement with the CB&Q by which the Union Pacific would build a new rail line north of the Platte River, allowing it to control freight in the northern part of the state. The B&MR would control freight in the southern half. Perkins demanded that the board choose between himself and Harris. In May 1878, Forbes ousted Harris and installed himself as president of the railroad.

=== Railroad presidency ===
The Nebraska division merged with the CB&Q in 1881. That year, John Murray Forbes stepped down as president of the Chicago, Burlington and Quincy, and Perkins succeeded him. Because the railroad's biggest financial backers were located in Boston, Massachusetts, he moved to that city.

Perkins was considered an "intelligent, forceful" railroad executive. He pushed for dual routes through market territories to keep his competitors out, created a highly regarded management team, and required that his railroad meet the highest engineering standards. During Perkins' tenure as president of the railroad, he bought up numerous other rail systems in order to expand his line's reach. These included the Hannibal and St. Joseph Railroad, Omaha and Republican Valley Railway, Grand Island and Wyoming Central Railroad, Big Horn Southern Railroad, and Chicago, Burlington and Northern Railroad. In 1886, he expanded the line's reach to St. Paul, Minnesota. In 1879, James Jerome Hill and others formed the Saint Paul, Minneapolis and Manitoba Railway (StPM&M). Perkins began seeking a way to add a line from Chicago to Saint Paul, Minnesota, in 1882. In 1883, Perkins took a secret trip over the StPM&M and reported to the CB&Q's board of directors that it appeared to be a well-engineered line which ran through excellent markets. Henry Davis Minot followed up with another investigation in 1884. In addition to seeking a lease of the StPM&M lines, Perkins also sought to build a line to St. Paul. The Minnesota legislature awarded the Chicago, Burlington and Northern Railroad (CB&N) a charter to build this line around the same time as Minot's study. But negotiations between the CB&Q's Boston investors and Hill dragged on. Hill was anxious for an agreement because the Milwaukee Road had already extended as far west as Fargo, North Dakota, and the Chicago and North Western Railroad was pushing west as well. The parties reached agreement on August 3, 1885, agreeing to buy large portions of stock in each other's company and placing Minot on the StPM&M's board of directors. Although publicly Hill denied existence of an alliance, Perkins authorized the CB&N to buy stock in StPM&m's depot subsidiary, leased StPM&M track between St. Paul and Minneapolis, and won the right to use the StPM&M's Minneapolis depot. The deal between the CB&N and StPM&M did not prove as profitable as expected, however, and Perkins was forced to absorb the former into the Chicago, Burlington and Quincy. In 1889, Perkins led the system in constructing tracks across Nebraska, South Dakota, and Wyoming so that it could link up with the Northern Pacific Railway near Billings, Montana.

=== Great strike of 1888 ===
As president of the system, he led the CB&Q through the Burlington Railroad Strike of 1888. Perkins was notably opposed to labor unions. In May 1886, he fired all known members of the Knights of Labor working for roads under his control. Now, Perkins also sought to eliminate unionization of workers on the CB&Q. He believed that unionized workers "owe allegiance to somebody else, and not to the railroad company that employs them." When the Brotherhood of Locomotive Engineers and Brotherhood of Locomotive Firemen demanded that the railroad honor its work rules and implement a uniform pay scale that did not discriminate against newly hired workers, Perkins refused. The union struck on February 27, 1888, and 97 percent of the locomotive engineers and brakemen walked out (even though the union represented only 65 percent of the workers). Perkins hired strikebreakers to replace the workers who had walked off the job. On March 5, the union asked unionized workers on other railroads to boycott the CB&Q by refusing to load freight onto its trains. Perkins went to federal court on March 8, seeking an injunction that would require the other railroads to load freight onto the CB&Q. The federal court issued the injunction on March 13, and almost every aspect of labor relations on every railroad engaged in interstate commerce came under court control. The injunction proved so effective that Perkins told his wife "the general impression this morning ... is that the total collapse [of the strike] is not far off." The strike was essentially over by the end of March 1888, but it lingered in some areas for another 10 months. The two unions ended their strike unilaterally in January 1889. For Eugene V. Debs, a local leader in the Brotherhood of Locomotive Firemen, the strike proved life-changing. Debs radically altered his thinking about labor-management relations, rejecting the idea of a social compact between management and labor. He now saw labor and management locked in a power struggle rather than cooperating toward a common goal.

=== Business practices ===
Perkins was not an advocate of vertical integration. Under CB&Q President Harris, the company had refused to build or purchase railroad track manufacturing plants (as many other large roads did). Nor did Harris attempt to build on his relationships with rail manufacturers to get them to ship rails via his system. Instead, Harris focused on agricultural developments along the CB&Q's route. But by 1883, members of the board of directors were pushing Perkins to start fostering industrial development along its tracks as a means of boosting freight. Perkins initially resisted, but over time adopted a policy of encouraging heavy industry to build along his system's rail lines so that they could become captive shippers.

=== Retirement and death ===
Charles Perkins resigned as president of the system in 1901 after New York City investors took control of the line. That year, James Jerome Hill, president of and the largest stockholder in the Great Northern Railway, won the financial support of J. P. Morgan for an attempt to take over the Chicago, Burlington and Quincy. Hill's strategy was for his railroad and Morgan's Northern Pacific Railway to jointly buy Perkins' railroad. However, Edward Henry Harriman, president of the Union Pacific Railroad and the Southern Pacific Railroad, also wanted to buy the CB&Q. Harriman demanded a one-third interest in the CB&Q, but Hill refused him. Harriman then began to buy up Northern Pacific's stock, forcing Hill and Morgan to try to retain their majority stockholder status in the road by purchasing more stock as well. Northern Pacific's stock price skyrocketed, and the artificially high stock threatened to cause a crash on the New York Stock Exchange. Hill and Morgan were ultimately successful in obtaining more Northern Pacific stock than Harriman, and won control not only of the Northern Pacific but also the Chicago, Burlington and Quincy. (Alarmed by Harriman's actions, Hill created a holding company—the Northern Securities Company—to control all three of his railroads. In 1904, in Northern Securities Co. v. United States, 193 U.S. 197, the Supreme Court of the United States held that Northern Securities violated the Sherman Antitrust Act. Hill was forced to disband his holding company and manage each railroad independently. The Northern Pacific, Great Northern, and Chicago, Burlington and Quincy would not formally merge until 1969.)

Perkins suffered from Bright's disease. He became confined to his home shortly before his death, and died at his home in Westwood, Massachusetts, on November 8, 1907. The day his funeral was held, the entire 8,000-mile (13,000 km) CB&Q railroad came to a halt as a memorial to him.

Perkins was married to Edith Forbes of Milton, Massachusetts, on September 22, 1864. The couple had seven children: Sons Robert, Charles and Samuel, and daughters Alice, Edith, Margaret, and Mary.

Although he died and was buried in Boston, Massachusetts, there is a large memorial in Aspen Grove Cemetery in Burlington. The large marble obelisk-style stone is the largest in the cemetery, and sits near a bluff overlooking the main line of the original CB&Q railroad.

=== Other business interests ===
Perkins was a director of other railroads as well, including the Hannibal and St. Joseph Railroad and the Kansas City, St. Joseph and Council Bluffs Railroad (both of which later merged with the Burlington line). He was also a member of the board of directors of the American Bell Telephone Company, whose headquarters were in Boston.

== Legacy ==
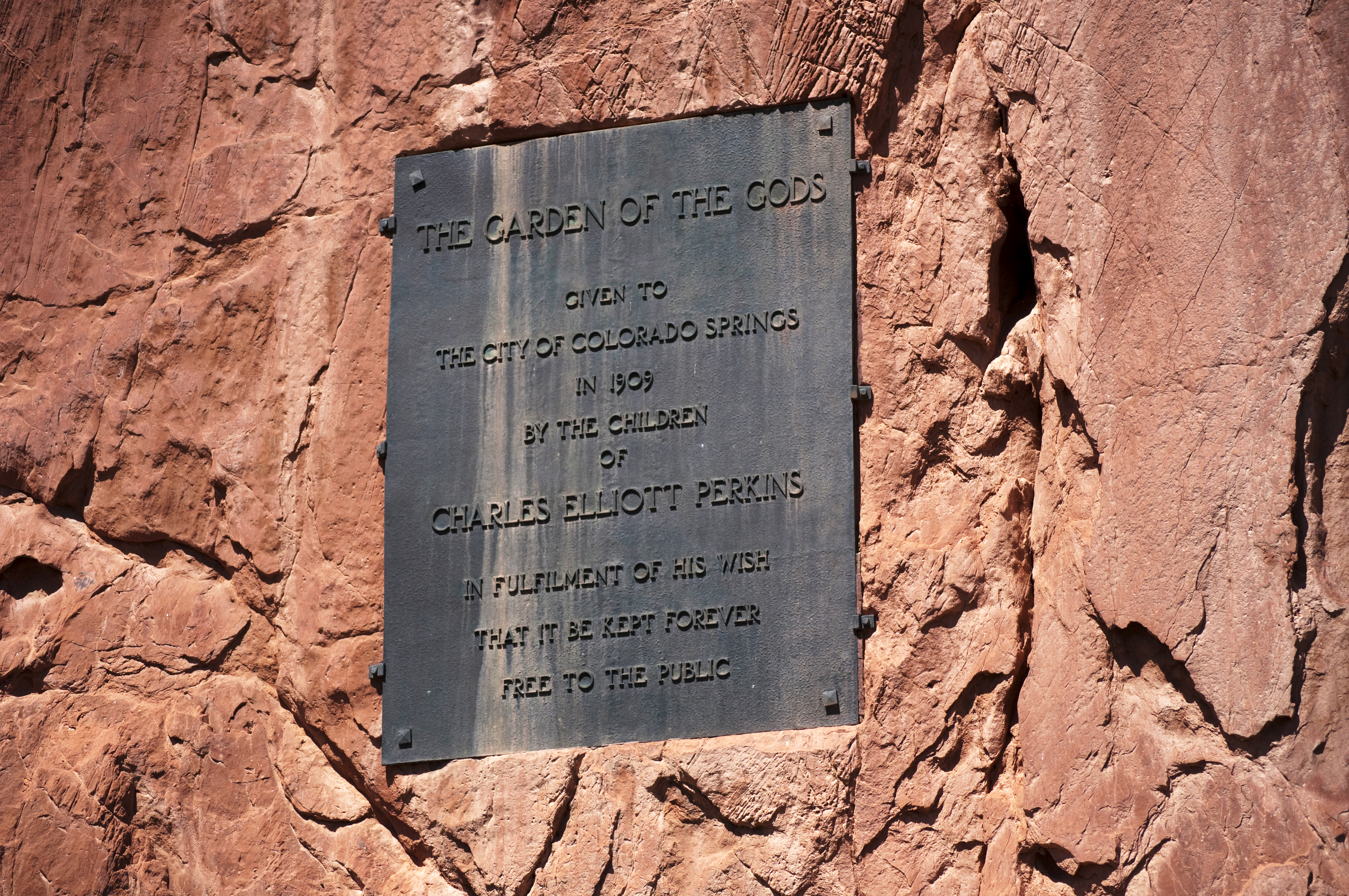
Plaque in the Garden of the Gods commemorating the donation of the land

Perkins is one of the most quoted railroad executives by historians of American railroads. Perkins owned a large estate in Burlington, named "Apple Trees." The building that houses the Burlington Community School District Board, and superintendent's offices was a mansion that was built by Perkins, and given to his son, Charles as a wedding present. The Burlington Community School District obtained the home in 1926 when they bought land from Perkins' widow for use to build a new Middle School, though the middle school no longer stands, and the land it once stood on was given back to the city as part of Perkins Park, the old mansion still stands in its original location, and most of the fixtures in the house are original to the home when it was built, other additions came from the school district over the years. Although the old mansion suffered some soot damage, and a couple of broken windows a result of the fire that gutted the school building that was built in front of it, it was later repainted, and the windows replaced to look identical to the originals. The Burlington Community School District once had an elementary school building, named for Perkins. Although the school itself is no longer active within the district, the building still remains at the corner of Summer Street, and Dodge Street, and is currently a private home, and business.

In 1879, Perkins purchased 240 acres (0.97 km^{2}) in the Garden of the Gods near Colorado Springs, Colorado. The purchase was originally intended for a summer home, but Perkins decided to leave the land in its natural state while acquiring additional land, all of which was informally open to the public for a number of years. In 1909, Perkins' children, knowing their father's feeling for the Garden of the Gods, conveyed his four-hundred eighty acres to the City of Colorado Springs to be operated permanently as a park, open to the public.

== Bibliography ==
- Bergman, Marvin. Iowa History Reader. Iowa City, Ia.: University of Iowa Press, 2008.
- Derby, George, and White, James Terry. The National Cyclopaedia of American Biography. New York: White, 1910.
- Donovan Jr. Frank P. Iowa Railroads: The Essays of Frank P. Donovan, Jr. H. Roger Grant, ed. Iowa City, Ia.: University of Iowa Press, 2000.
- Dubofsky, Melvyn. The State and Labor in Modern America. Chapel Hill, N.C.: University of North Carolina Press, 1994.
- Dubofsky, Melvyn, and Van Tine, Warren R. Labor Leaders in America. Urbana, Ill.: University of Illinois Press, 1987.
- Emerson, Wilimena Hannah; Eliot, Ellsworth; Eliot Jr., George Edwin; and Eliot Jr., William Horace. Genealogy of the Descendants of John Eliot, 'Apostle to the Indians,' 1598-1905. New Haven, Conn.: The Tuttle, Morehouse & Taylor Press, 1905.
- Glasner, David. Business Cycles and Depressions: An Encyclopedia. Florence, Ky.: Taylor & Francis, 1997.
- Gue, Benjamin F. History of Iowa, From the Earliest Times to the Beginning of the Twentieth Century. New York: Century History Co., 1903.
- Hidy, Ralph W.; Hidy, Muriel E.; and Scott, Roy V. The Great Northern Railway: A History. Minneapolis: University of Minnesota Press, 2004.
- Hudson, David; Bergman, Marvin; and Horton, Loren N. The Biographical Dictionary of Iowa. Iowa City, Iowa: University of Iowa Press, 2008.
- Ingham, John N. "Forbes, John Murray." In Biographical Dictionary of American Business Leaders. Wesport, Conn.: Greenwood Press, 1983.
- Klein, Maury. The Life and Legend of Jay Gould. Baltimore: Johns Hopkins University Press, 1986.
- Klein, Maury. Unfinished Business: The Railroad in American Life. Hanover, Conn.: University Press of New England, 1997.
- Klein, Maury. Union Pacific: 1862-1893. Minneapolis: University of Minnesota Press, 2006.
- McMurry, Donald L. The Great Burlington Strike of 1888: A Case History in Labor Relations (Harvard UP, 1956)
- Martin, Albro. James J. Hill and the Opening of the Northwest. St. Paul: Minnesota Historical Society Press, 1991.
- O'Malley, Therese, and Treib, Marc. Regional Garden Design in the United States. Washington, D.C.: Dumbarton Oaks Research Library and Collection, 1995.
- Overton, Richard C. Burlington Route: A history of the Burlington lines (1965)
- Salvatore, Nick. Eugene V. Debs: Citizen and Socialist. Urbana, Ill.: University of Illinois Press, 1982.
- Solomon, Brian. Burlington Northern Santa Fe Railway. St. Paul, Minn.: MBI Publishing, 2005.
- Ussleman, Steven W. Regulating Railroad Innovation: Business, Technology, and Politics in America, 1840-1920. New York: Cambridge University Press, 2002.
