= Daniel Keefe =

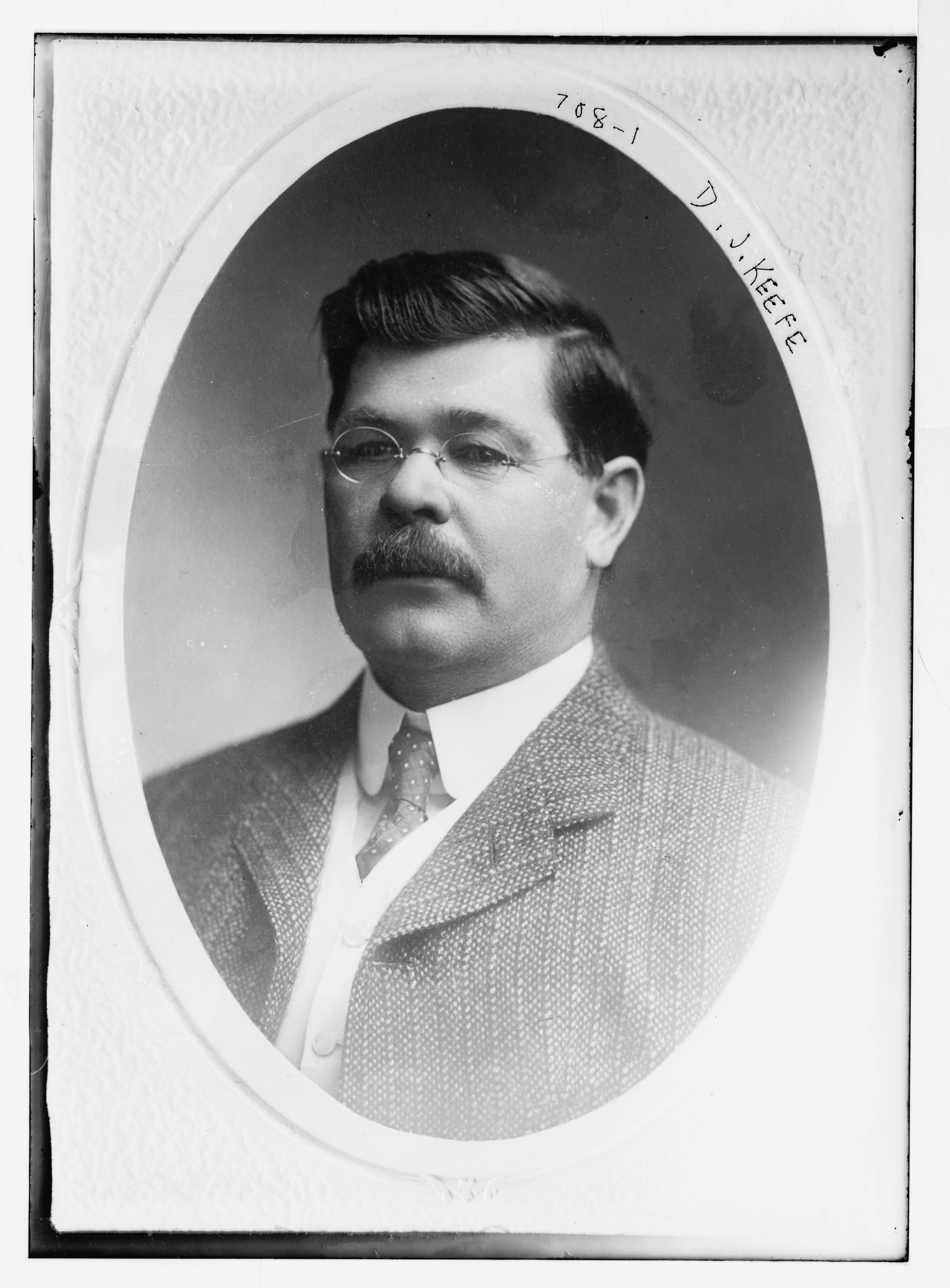

Commissioner General of Immigration
- In office July 1, 1909 – May 31, 1913
- President: William Howard Taft; Woodrow Wilson
- Preceded by: Frank P. Sargent
- Succeeded by: Anthony Caminetti

Personal details
- Born: Daniel Joseph Keefe; September 27, 1852 Willow Springs, Illinois, U.S.
- Died: January 2, 1929 (aged 76) Elmhurst, Illinois, U.S.
- Party: Republican

Daniel Joseph Keefe (September 27, 1852 – January 2, 1929) was a founder and the first president of the International Longshoremen's Association (ILA), a trade union representing waterside workers in Canada and the United States of America.

== Early life ==
Born in Willow Springs, Illinois the son of a teamster (wagon driver) of Irish ancestry, Daniel Keefe left school in the fourth grade and began working on the Chicago waterfront. In 1877, Keefe organized fellow workers into the Association of Lumber Handlers (ALH) and in 1882 was elected leader of the organization. While successful in expanding membership of the organization, from the start Keefe was considered conservative within the labour movement, focusing on winning wage rises and keeping the ALH away from broader trade union struggles of the time, notably the Eight-Hour Day movement during the 1880s.

== Emergence, growth and leadership of the International Longshoremen's Association ==
In 1892 at a convention in Detroit, eleven local unions representing waterside workers from the Great Lakes region formed a single organization, the National Longshoremen's Association of the United States, and elected Daniel Keefe as president. By 1895 following recruitment of workers in Canada, the organization was renamed the International Longshoremen's Association (ILA) and Keefe affiliated the union to the American Federation of Labor (AFL). Under Keefe's leadership the union grew from 50,000 members in 1900 to 100,000 members by 1905, including expanding membership outside the Great Lakes region across the United States.

== Leadership style, break from the AFL and departure from ILA ==
According to de la Pedraja: "[Keefe] was a shrewd negotiator with employers...and was able to obtain modest concessions for the Longshoremen." Because of the modest nature of these gains, some unions viewed Keefe's actions as company unionism. However, in the context of waterside workers coming under attack from employers elsewhere, especially New York City, Keefe's approach was accepted by others. Yet, it is acknowledged that Keefe was a conservative trade union leader who maintained strict control over the union and refused to endorse the Democratic Party in United States national politics. This eventually led to his conflicting with other elements of the ILA and following his endorsement of Republican William Taft in the 1908 Presidential Election, rather than face an inevitable loss of position, he resigned following Taft's victory and accepted the position of Commissioner–General of Immigration in the new administration.

== Later career in public administration ==
Daniel Keefe was part of a succession of trade union leaders who took the position of Commissioner General of Immigration. Stanford Lyman argues that Keefe fitted the role, like his predecessors, because of nativist views and a willingness to use the post to enforce exclusion of migrant workers, especially from China. Keefe resigned from the position on May 31, 1913, and took a position in the Department of Labor for the rest of the decade. From 1921 to 1925 he worked at the United States Shipping Board Merchant Fleet Corporation handling labour disputes.

Daniel Keefe died on January 2, 1929, in Elmhurst, Illinois.

Political offices
Preceded by Frank P. Sargent	Commissioner General of Immigration; 1909–1913	Succeeded by Anthony Caminetti
