= Patrick Fennell =

American locomotive engineer, trade unionist, and poet

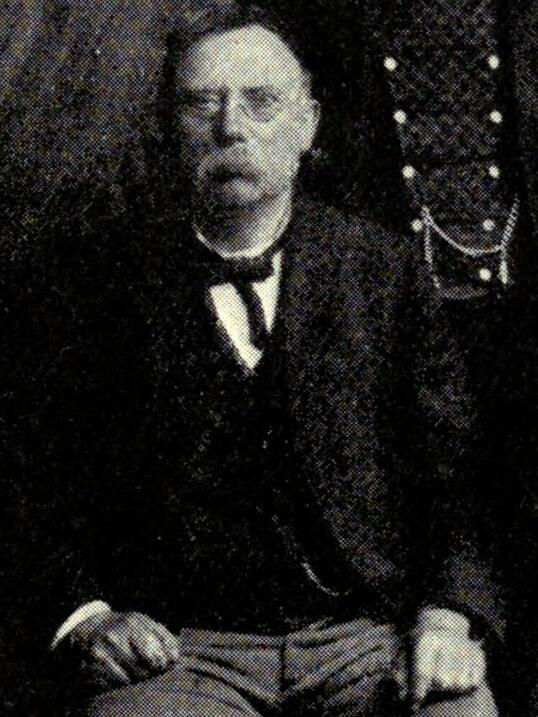
- Patrick Fennell in May, 1909
- Born: 1842
- Died: 1917 (aged 74–75)
- Occupation: Writer, trade unionist, poet

Patrick Fennell (1842–1917) was an American locomotive engineer, union member of the Brotherhood of Locomotive Engineers, and writer, whose verse as "Shandy Maguire", among others, was a staple of the Locomotive Engineers Journal, and other trade and union publications.

In May 1909 he was a guest of the United Kingdom's Associated Society of Locomotive Engineers and Firemen at their triennial conference, in Liverpool, along with W. S. Carter, President of the American Brotherhood of Firemen and Enginemen. Their tour of England concluded with a special train to take them from London to Southampton.

Born in 1842, he died around age 75 in 1917.

His book Recitations, epics, epistles, lyrics and poems, humorous and pathetic was dedicated:

To the Brotherhood of Locomotive Engineers, An organization munificent in charity, Adherent to principles, Its members faithful to duty and unselfish in peril, The contents of the following pages are fraternally dedicated by one who is proud to be one of their number: The Author.

== Selected publications ==
- Recitations, epics, epistles, lyrics and poems, humorous and pathetic. (1886, Oswego, N.Y. : R.J. Oliphant, printer; reprinted 2012, Hardpress Publishing, ISBN 9781290400787)
- Random rhymes and rhapsodies of the rail (1907, Cleveland, O., The Cleveland printing Co.; reprinted 2012, Rarebooksclub.com, ISBN 9781154964073)
