= Glenn E. Plumb =

American lawyer

Glenn Edward Plumb
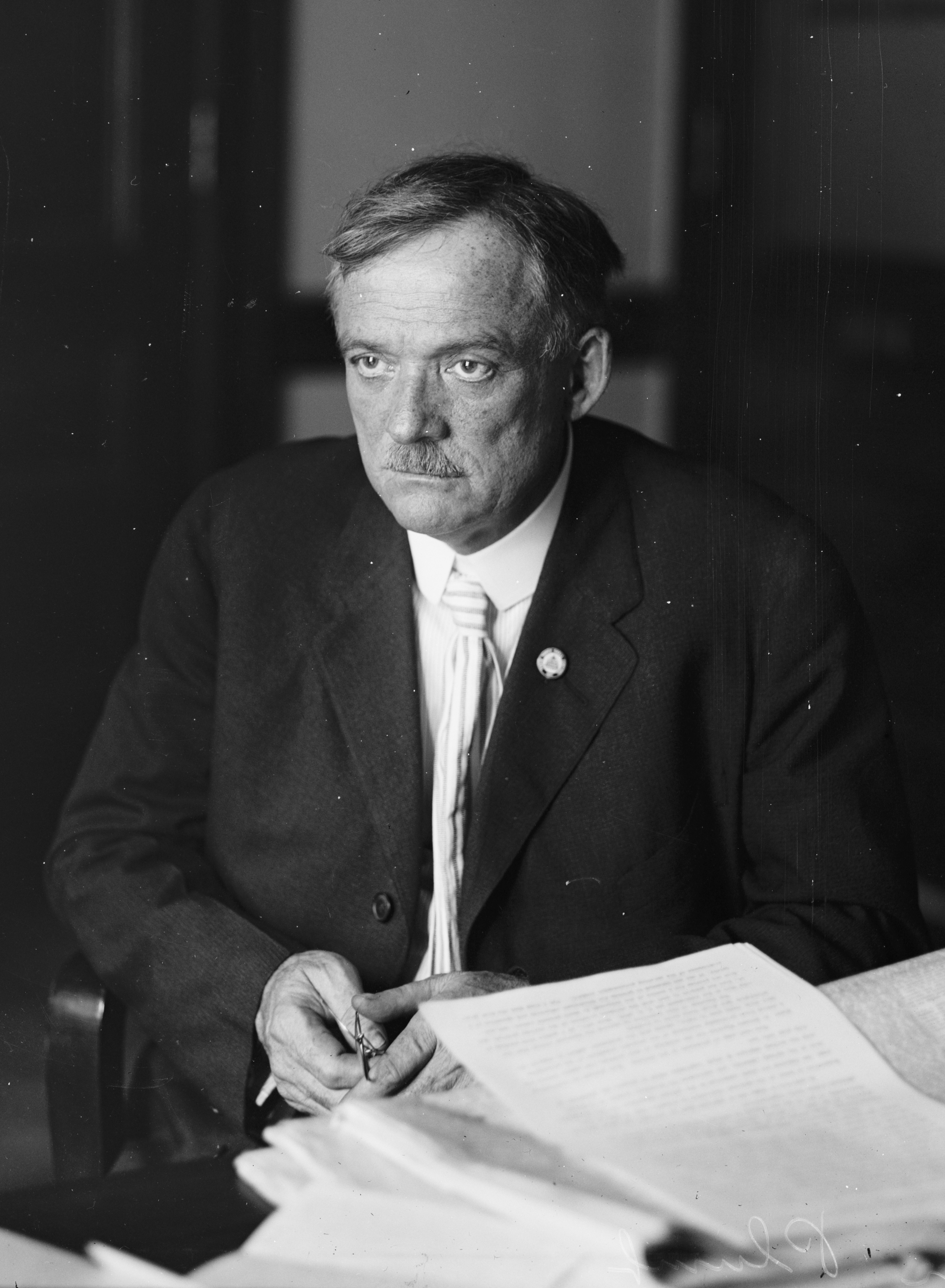
- Plumb c. 1919
- Born: 1866; Clay County, Iowa, United States
- Died: 1 August 1922 (aged 55); Washington, D.C., United States
- Occupation: Lawyer
- Known for: Plumb Plan

Glenn Edward Plumb (1866 – 1 August 1922) was an American lawyer who was famous for proposing a radical plan for cooperative railway ownership, the Plumb plan, in 1918. He founded the Plumb Plan League to support the proposal. Despite strong support from organized labor, including railroad workers, miners and farm workers, the plan was not adopted.

== Life ==
Glenn Edward Plumb was born in Clay County, Iowa in 1866. He became a lawyer, and was counsel for the City of Chicago when they were fighting against promoters of street railways. Plumb was a member of the legal department of Edward Fitzsimmons Dunne's administration in Chicago, as were J. Hamilton Lewis and Clarence Darrow. They attacked corporate tax evasion and corporate privileges, winning a notable victory when the Supreme Court struck down the "eternal monopoly" laws. In Blair v. City of Chicago, 201 U.S. 400 (1906) Plumb and Clarence Darrow both represented the City of Chicago. They argued that the street railways did not have an irrevocable right to use Chicago's streets, but required city council authorization.

Plumb was appointed counsel for sixteen major railroad workers' organizations. By late 1917, during World War I, the railroad system in the eastern U.S. had virtually come to a halt. Problems included a shortage of labor due to low wages, and policies designed to maximize profits that prevented movement of empty cars at a time when most traffic was from west to east. On 26 December 1917 the Federal government of Woodrow Wilson took over control of the railroads. Plumb was in favor of making this arrangement permanent, and defined a cooperative structure in his "Plumb plan". He set up the Plumb Plan League to promote the plan in February 1918.

The Armistice with Germany took effect on 11 November 1918. The railway labor unions wanted to retain government control after the armistice, but on 2 December 1918 President Wilson told Congress that the railroads had to be returned to their owners. Later that month in a referendum of railroad workers 306,720 out of 308,186 voted to keep government control. The Railway Employees' Department of the American Federation of Labor (AFL) put its weight behind the Plumb Plan League. The Plumb plan was supported by labor leaders such as Warren Stanford Stone of the Brotherhood of Locomotive Engineers, who felt it should be extended to other industries. Workers should be given an incentive to make their industry productive, and a reward for their effort.

The plan was opposed by others such as Samuel Gompers of the AFL who was opposed to socialism and felt that government involvement would result in loss of workers' rights to bargain for their labor. Gompers had been attending the Versailles conference in Europe when he was called home to deal with labor unrest. He landed at Hoboken, New Jersey, on 26 August 1919. He met with Plumb immediately on arrival, and was guardedly critical of the plan, which involved too much state control for his taste. He made it clear that he had not authorized use of his name as honorary president of the Plumb Plan League.

Plumb submitted his plan to the U.S. Senate's interstate commerce committee in 1919. Frederic C. Howe, commissioner of immigration and later a founder of the American Civil Liberties Union, resigned in the summer of 1919 to work for the Plan. He was labelled the "Plumb Plan agitator" by agents of J. Edgar Hoover's Bureau of Investigation on watch for Bolsheviks. At the United Mine Workers convention in Cleveland in September 1919 the delegates endorsed the plan, and also approved nationalizing the mining industry. The Labor Party of the United States held its first national convention in Chicago in November 1919. The party endorsed the Plumb Plan in the Declaration of Principles agreed during that meeting. When Plumb spoke at the January 1920 AFL convention the delegates ignored Gompers and voted by 29,159 to 8,349 to nationalize the railroads and place them under democratic management.

Despite worker enthusiasm, the plan had little chance of being adopted. The National Association of Owners of Railroad Securities (NAORS) represented bank and insurance companies with railroad holdings. They had noted the improvements during the period of Federal control of the railways but rejected the Plumb plan, although they did call for some public ownership of railroad infrastructure. The railroad executives were hostile, and there was little support in the House or the Senate. According to former President William Howard Taft the plan was "radically socialistic." Business groups also saw the proposal as being suspiciously similar to socialism. In February 1920 Congress passed the Cummins-Esch bill, returning the railroads to their private owners.

Plumb's name was mentioned as a possible presidential candidate at the Farmer-Labor Party convention in Chicago in June 1920.

Glenn Edward Plumb lost a leg to gangrene on 18 May 1922. He died on 1 August 1922 in Georgetown University Hospital in Washington, D.C. from heart disease. He was aged 56.

== Plumb plan ==
Under the Plumb plan, the railways would be owned cooperatively. The federal government would sell bonds and use them to purchase the railroads. All railroads would be merged in a public corporation. Rates would be set by the Interstate Commerce Commission. The government would be paid 5% of revenue as a rental fee. Half of the profits would be given to the employees of the railroad and the other half would be used to retire the bonds.

A board of directors with 15 members would control the railroad. The president of the United States would appoint five members, who would represent the public. The workers would elect five members and management would elect five members. The administration would be tripartite, including representatives of workers' unions, shippers' organizations and bondholders. The plan showed how the interests of workers and farmers in the national transportation system could be protected. It could readily be adapted for other industries, such as mining.

Plumb said the plan would

supplant the old system of competition under which the profits of the laborer's industry went to another, and in which he could never hope to share, by a new system where the profit of his industry accrued to himself alone, where all employees were united by a common purpose, all working toward a common end, inspired by the same motives, by the same incentives, and with no opportunity for a division of interest and no apprehension that another would reap what he had sown.

The plan was considered in Congress in the Sims Bill of 1919, which did not pass.

== Bibliography ==
- Plumb, Glenn Edward (1917). "Charter Limitations as Affecting the Valuation of the Properties of Railway Companies.": An Address Delivered Before the National Association of State Utility Commissioners, Washington, D.C., Oct. 17, 1917 ....
- Plumb, Glenn Edward (1918). Adjustment of Labor's Demands During Federal Control of Railroad Operation.
- Plumb, Glenn Edward (1919b). Address of Glenn E. Plumb: To Convention of United Mine Workers of America, Cleveland, Ohio, Saturday, September 13, 1919.
- Plumb, Glenn Edward; Brotherhood of Locomotive Engineers (U.S.) (1919). Memorandum Submitted by Glenn E. Plumb Before the Interstate Commerce Committee of the United States Senate in Behalf of the Brotherhood of Locomotive Engineers, Brotherhood of Locomotive Firemen and Enginemen, Order of Railway Conductors and the Brotherhood of Railway Trainmen.
- Plumb, Glenn E. (1919a). Labor's plan for government ownership and democracy in the operation of the railroads: based on statements by Glenn E. Plumb before the Interstate Commerce Committee of the United States Senate, with additional material. The Plumb Plan League.
- Plumb, Glenn E.; Garretson, A. B. (1919). Extension of Tenure of Government Control of Railroads: Extracts from Hearings Before the Committee on Interstate Commerce United States Senate, 65th Congress, Statements.
- Plumb, Glenn Edward (1920). Address of Glenn E. Plumb (author of the Plumb Plan): Delivered to the Fifth Biennial Convention of the Railway Employes Department of the American Federation of Labor, in Kansas City, Missouri, on Thursday, April 15, 1920.
- Plumb, Glenn E.; Roylance, William G. (1923). Industrial Democracy. A Plan for Its Achievement. New York.
