= Warren Stanford Stone =

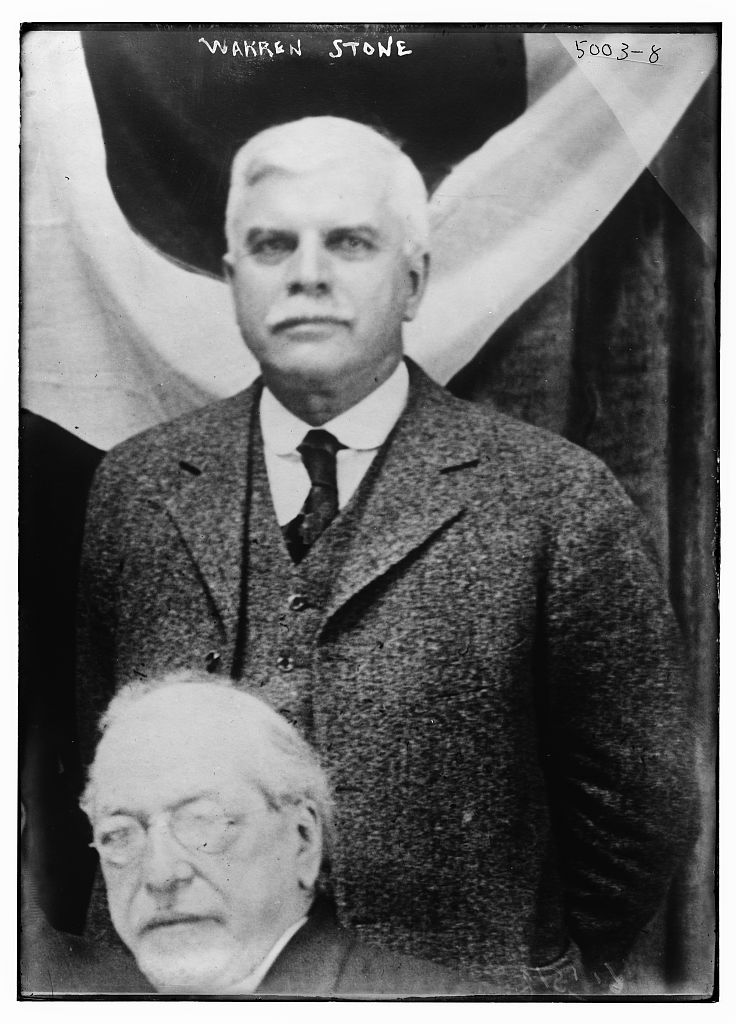
- Stone in 1919
- Born: 1 February 1860; Ainsworth, Iowa
- Died: 12 June 1925 (aged 65); Cleveland, Ohio
- Occupation: Locomotive Engineer
- Known for: Grand Chief, Brotherhood of Locomotive Engineers

Warren Stanford Stone (1 February 1860 – 12 June 1925) was a railway worker who rose to head the Brotherhood of Locomotive Engineers in the United States from 1903 to 1925. He was unusual as a labor leader in that he did not believe in compulsory union membership and was comfortable with "labor capitalism". He supported a radical plan in which workers in an industry would take one-third of the profits, the other thirds going to capital and the public. By the end of his tenure the Brotherhood controlled investments worth over $100 million.

== Early years ==
Warren Stanford Stone was born on 1 February 1860 on a farm near Ainsworth, Washington County, Iowa. He attended Western College, Iowa. When Stone completed his academic education in May 1879, he considered studying to become a surgeon, while his father wanted him to become a lawyer. Instead of taking either course, he started work on a railway. He obtained a job as a locomotive fireman with the Chicago, Rock Island and Pacific Railroad in 1879, based in Eldon, Iowa. He was promoted to engineman five years later. He spent a further nineteen years in this position. In 1884 he married Carrie E. Newell. They had no children.

== Labor leader ==
In August 1903 Stone was elected grand chief engineer of the International Brotherhood of Locomotive Engineers to succeed Peter M. Arthur, who had died unexpectedly. Stone was a Republican but had progressive views. Several U.S. presidents offered him political appointments, but he refused them. Stone believed that if a worker "wants to join a union, all right, but it is contrary to the principles of free government and the Constitution of the United States . . . to make him join." He had no problem with "labor capitalism", where union members would invest their savings to achieve the maximum return, even if that meant investing in non-union enterprises.

Stone was proposed as a challenger to Samuel Gompers, President of the American Federation of Labor at that organization's Chicago conference in January 1920. Gompers believed the federation should take a non-socialist approach in representing wage-earners, campaigning for better wages, better hours, better working conditions and the unfettered right to strike. Stone supported the radical Glenn E. Plumb plan for tripartite control of the railway industry by labor, capital and the public, and supported similar plans for other industries.

Stone appeared on the cover of Time magazine on 10 March 1924. Stone was one of the main supporters of the Progressive Party that backed Senator Robert M. La Follette, Sr. as candidate for President of the United States in 1924. In June 1924 the triennial convention of the Brotherhood created the office of President and elected Stone to this position. He was succeeded as grand chief engineer by L. G. Gritting.

== Financier ==
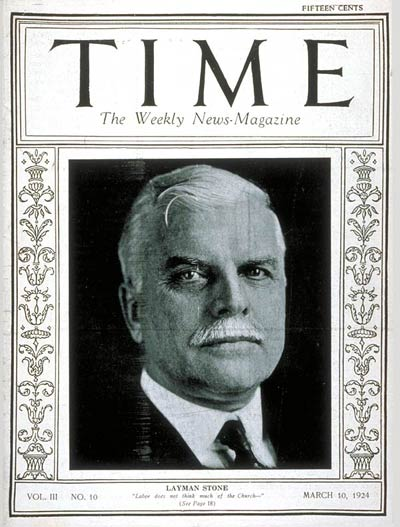
Time Cover, 10 Mar 1924

Stone was a financier as well as a labor leader. Under his leadership the Brotherhood of Locomotive Engineers engaged in a wide range of financial activities in banks, trust companies and other business ventures. The Brotherhood of Locomotive Engineers' Cooperative Bank was formed in Cleveland, Ohio in November 1920, and took over $1 million in deposits in the first two months. Based on this success, the Brotherhood opened a number of banks in different cities. To manage its investments the Brotherhood established the Brotherhood Holding Company in 1922 and the Brotherhood Investment Company in 1923. It was on Stone’s initiative that the 22-story Brotherhood of Locomotive Engineers' Bank building was erected, completed just before his death. The building was owned by the Brotherhood of Locomotive Engineers and leased to the Brotherhood of Locomotive Engineers Co-Operatlve National Bank.

Stone and other members of the Brotherhood of Locomotive Engineers became owners of the Coal River Collieries, and Stone became chairman of the board of directors of the mine. A dispute arose with John L. Lewis, president of the United Mine Workers of America. Lewis claimed that Stone was closing mines and throwing miners out of work rather than pay the union scale. Stone refuted this, saying the unions had not renewed their agreement, but the mines were being worked on a cooperative plan. He said "We feel sure there are no better-satisfied men employed anywhere than in the Coal River Collieries."

== Death and legacy ==
Warren Stanford Stone died on 12 June 1925 of Bright's disease in a hospital in Cleveland, Ohio. At the time of his death, the Brotherhood of Locomotive Engineers had majority interests in enterprises with assets of approximately $150,000,000. Throughout his tenure as head of the railway engineers, they had never had to call a strike. Stone was succeeded as president by William B. Prenter. Alvanley Johnston became grand chief engineer.

Awards and achievements
Preceded by Reginald McKenna	Cover of Time Magazine; 3 March 1924	Succeeded by Eugene O'Neill
