= William D. Robinson =

American locomotive engineer (1826–1890)

- William D. Robinson
- Born: 22 May 1826
- Died: 7 November 1890 (aged 64); Washington, Indiana, United States
- Occupation: Locomotive engineer
- Known for: Founder of the Brotherhood of Locomotive Engineers

William D. Robinson (22 May 1826 – 7 November 1890) was a locomotive engineer who founded the Brotherhood of Locomotive Engineers (BLE) on 8 May 1863 during the American Civil War, America's first union for railway workers. Robinson traveled widely and oversaw rapid growth in the union's first sixteen months. After a disastrous strike he was forced to resign in August 1864, and did not hold office again, although he remained active in union affairs until his death.

== Early years ==
William D. Robinson was born on 22 May 1826. He started work as a fireman in 1846, and was promoted to locomotive engineer in 1848. He was employed by the New Albany & Salem Railroad.

On 6–9 November 1855 a convention of locomotive engineers was held in Baltimore at which it was agreed to form a "National Protective Association of the Brotherhood of Locomotive Engineers of the United States." Benjamin Hoxie was elected President, and William D. Robinson secretary. The organization held a number of meetings up to the outbreak of the American Civil War in 1861, but did not make much progress. The New Albany & Salem Railroad ran into financial difficulties and was having trouble meeting payroll. In the fall of 1862 Robinson's friend J.C. Thompson arranged for him to be hired by the Michigan Central Railroad, and he moved to Detroit.

== Union leader ==
In April 1863 nineteen locomotive engineers met at Robinson's house and decided to form an organization to represent their interests. Robinson was discharged from Michigan Central as an agitator. As Grand Chief he traveled widely between October 1863 and August 1864, and organized fifty-four local divisions.

On 1 July 1864 the employees of the Philadelphia and Reading Railroad went on strike for more pay. On 11 July 1864 the army seized the railroad and took over operations. On 16 July the strike was called off. Half the strikers, or about 75 men, got their jobs back at existing pay. The others were dismissed. It is not clear that the union had sanctioned the strike, since all employees were involved, not just locomotive engineers, and the strike was for more pay rather than for preserving existing rights. However, when the Brotherhood of the Footboard held their convention in Indianapolis on 17 August 1864 they changed their name to the Brotherhood of Locomotive Engineers and replaced Robinson as Grand Chief Engineer by Charles Wilson. The first, radical, phase of the union was over.

== Later career ==
Robinson was reinstated in his old local in May 1873. Later that year the Pennsylvania Railroad ordered a reduction of pay, and the engineers went on strike. Charles Wilson publicly criticized their action. The Brotherhood called a special meeting in Cleveland on 25 February 1874. Robinson made a spirited speech vindicating the strikers, and was applauded by the delegates. Charles Wilson was forced to resign and was replaced as Grand Chief Engineer by Peter M. Arthur.

For reasons of health, Robinson retired from railroad work in 1883, but continued to be active with the Brotherhood. He spoke in 1890 at a meeting of the five Brotherhoods of Railroad Fraternities, where he was reported to be old and feeble, but gave a speech full of "sound advice and encouragement". Robinson died after a prolonged illness from cancer of the stomach on 7 November 1890 in Washington, Daviess County, Indiana, at the age of 64. During his life he had seen the Brotherhood grow to 28,000 members in 452 lodges across North America. A marker was erected in 1974 at his house in Marshall, Calhoun County, Michigan, where the Railroad Union was born.

== Sources ==
- Atkins, William Arthur (2004), "National Union of Iron Molders", St. James Encyclopedia of Labor History Worldwide: Major Events in Labor History and Their Impact, The Gale Group
- "A Great Order's Founder". The Conductor and Brakeman. 1890. p. 567.
- Blackman, John L. Jr. (1 January 1987). "The Seizure of the Reading Railroad in 1864". Pennsylvania Magazine of History and Biography. 111 (1).
- Brennan, James (2013). "Railroad Union Birthplace". Michigan Historical Markers.
- Commons, John Rogers; Sumner, Helen Laura; Saposs, David Joseph; Andrews, John Bertram; Perlman, Selig; Hoagland, Henry Elmer (1918-12-01). History of Labour in the United States. Beard Books. ISBN 978-1-893122-75-8.
- Debs, Eugene V. "William D. Robinson," Locomotive Firemen's Magazine, vol. 14, no. 12 (Dec. 1890), pp. 1105–1108.
- Foner, Philip Sheldon (1947), History of the Labor Movement in the United States, International Publishers, ISBN 978-0-7178-0376-7
- "History". Brotherhood of Locomotive Engineers and Trainmen. Archived from the original on 2016-03-06.
- "History of the Brotherhood of Locomotive Engineers & Trainmen". Locomotive Engineers and Trainmen News. Teamsters. June–July 2007.
- Hoffa, James P.; Hall, Ken (8 May 2013). "Teamsters Honor 150 Year Anniversary Of The Brotherhood Of Locomotive Engineers And Trainmen". International Brotherhood of Teamsters.
- "William D. Robinson". The Railroad Trainman. Brotherhood of Railroad Trainmen. 1891. p. 7.
