= Peter M. Arthur =

- Peter M. Arthur
- Born: Peter McArthur; 1831; Paisley, Scotland
- Died: 17 July 1903 (aged 71–72)
- Occupation: Trade union functionary
- Known for: Grand Chief Engineer of the Brotherhood of Locomotive Engineers

Peter M. Arthur (1831 – 17 July 1903) was a Scottish immigrant to the United States who was leader of the Brotherhood of Locomotive Engineers (BLE) for many years. He led his union in a major ten-month strike against the CB&Q Railroad in 1888, and lost badly.

== Early years ==
Peter McArthur was born in 1831 in Paisley, Scotland (he would change his name to Peter M. Arthur later in life). In 1842 he emigrated to the United States with his uncle, at first helping on a farm in New York State. He learned the blacksmith and machinist trades. In 1849 he became a railroad worker, and was later promoted to engineer on the New York Central Railroad. He was one of the early members of the Brotherhood of Locomotive Engineers, which was founded in May 1863, and he quickly rose through the ranks.

In 1863 the Pennsylvania Railroad ordered a reduction of pay, and the engineers walked off the job. The BLE leader Charles Wilson publicly criticized the strike action. The Brotherhood called a special meeting in Cleveland on 25 February 1874. The founder of the BLE, William D. Robinson, made a spirited speech vindicating the strikers. Charles Wilson was forced to resign and Arthur was elected Grand Chief Engineer.

== Union leader ==
In 1875 Arthur negotiated the first contract between a union and a railroad with the New York Central Railroad of William Henry Vanderbilt. The contract included a guaranteed daily wage. In 1876 the BLE was involved in an unsuccessful strike against the Boston and Maine Railroad. The next year Arthur and the BLE had to deal with the Great Railroad Strike of 1877, in which the BLE allied itself with the Workingmen's Party of the United States. After the collapse of that effort, the BLE became a more restricted organization. Members had to be white, literate, 21 or older and experienced engineers, and from 1885 could not belong to other labor organizations. By 1887 the BLE had over 25,000 members, and in the 1880s negotiated contracts with more than 100 railroads. The BLE set up exemplary employee benefit and insurance plans.

Arthur worked to establish good relations with railroad managers, preferring to negotiate rather than call a strike. It was said of Arthur that he "had rare skill in formulating reasonable demands, and by consistently putting moderate demands strongly instead of immoderate demands weakly he kept the good will of railroad managers, while steadily obtaining better terms for his men." However, in the mid-1880s labor unrest grew. The BLE was successful in several strikes against granger roads, but the Burlington Railroad Strike of 1888 did not succeed. The rival Knights of Labor undercut the BLE, replacing the striking engineers with their own members. Arthur withdrew from the strike and returned to a policy of cooperating with the railroad management. Arthur would not support the Knights of Labor in their strike against New York Central Railroad in 1890. Arthur also undermined the efforts of Eugene V. Debs in 1893–1894 to make gains for the members of the American Railway Union.

In his later life, while still heading the BLE, Arthur became a wealthy man. He made wise real estate investments and acquired a sizable fortune. He bought an imposing stone mansion in Cleveland, became a bank director and was a leading citizen of Cleveland. Arthur died unexpectedly on 17 July 1903, and the Grand Assistant Chief A.B. Youngson became head of the union. However, Youngson was himself on his deathbed, and died on 31 July 1903. Warren Stanford Stone became his successor.
