= Alvanley Johnston =

- Johnston pictured in a 1934 Fortune magazine article
- Born: 12 May 1875; Seeley's Bay, Ontario, Canada
- Died: 17 September 1951 (aged 76); Shaker Heights, Ohio, United States
- Occupations: Locomotive engineer, labor leader
- Known for: Grand Chief Engineer of the Brotherhood of Locomotive Engineers

Alvanley Johnston (12 May 1875 – 17 September 1951) was a Canadian / American locomotive engineer who became head of the Brotherhood of Locomotive Engineers (BLE), a union that covered the United States and Canada, holding the title of Grand Chief Engineer from 1925 to 1950. During his tenure the Brotherhood recovered from financial problems, weathered the Great Depression and World War II, and held out for shorter hours and higher wages in a nationwide strike in 1946.

== Early years ==
Alvanley Johnston was born on 12 May 1875 in Seeley's Bay, Ontario. The county borders on New York State. His parents were David and Annie (Jarrell) Johnston, both citizens of the United States. He attended elementary school in Seeley's Bay, then in 1888 his parents took him to the United States. In 1890 he returned to Ontario to attend business college at Brockville. He left the college in 1891. On 18 September 1892 he was hired by the Great Northern Railway as a callboy. (Note: A railroad callboy had the task of gathering train crews from their homes or taverns before the train could start, and if they were inebriated of leading them to the station.) He also worked as a wiper, and then was a locomotive engineer from 1897 to 1909. From 1909 to 1918 he was general chairman of the Great Northern Division of the Brotherhood of Locomotive Engineers (BLE).

At the brotherhood's triennial convention in June 1924 the new office of President was created, and the former grand chief engineer Warren Stanford Stone was elected to this position. He was succeeded as grand chief engineer by L. G. Gritting. William B. Prenter was made first vice-president in charge of finance and H. T. Dougherty was made second vice-president in charge of insurance and pension departments. Stone remained overall leader of the Brotherhood. Stone died in 1925 and was succeeded by Prenter. In the reshuffle, Johnston became grand chief engineer.

Around this time an audit found that the Brotherhood's cooperative bank in New York had about $1 million of "doubtful paper" and other investments were also in poor shape. The executives decided to attempt a high-risk investment to make good the losses before the 91,000 union members learned of the problem. After some hesitations, they agreed to buy 30,511 acres (12,347 ha) of land in Venice, Florida, for $4 million, planning to develop it as a profitable resort. Much work was done, but the project and others launched at that time drained funds and forced the Brotherhood to sell valuable assets.

In March 1927 Prenter was warned by the Brotherhood's attorneys that "There has been no estimate of the amount needed for expenditures in the Florida venture ... no provision that it is properly financed." Prenter ignored calls to take immediate action. At the triennial convention in Cleveland on 6 June 1927 the delegates learned of the mismanagement and losses and threw Prenter and other members of the executive out of office. Johnston was selected to replace Prenter.

== Union leader ==
Johnston became the sole leader of the union in 1927, with the titles of president, vice president, and secretary eliminated. Through his efforts the Brotherhood's finances were set in order and eventually the union again became solvent.

In the spring of 1929 industrial production began to decline in the United States, signalling the start of the ten-year-long Great Depression. The economy continued to contract for several years. Banks closed and many workers lost their jobs. Freight traffic decreased and there was a steady drop of employment on the railroads. Daniel Willard, President of the Baltimore and Ohio Railroad, met with other leaders of his industry who agreed that the Interstate Commerce Commission had to approve higher freight rates and the unions had to accept wage cuts if the railroads were to stay solvent. In October 1931 Willard arranged for Johnston and the heads of the other main railroad operating brotherhoods to dine with him and the presidents of three railroads in Manhattan. He found the labor leaders willing to talk about the possibility of wage cuts.

In October 1932 Johnston was a member of a Presidential committee that endorsed President Herbert Hoover's New Deal program to stimulate the economy, and called for additional spending on public works. In 1934 Johnston was convicted of mishandling the funds of the Standard Trust Bank of Cleveland, which had failed. The bank was partly owned by the BLE and he was the chairman. Johnston's conviction was overturned on appeal on the grounds that he was not aware of what was being done.

Johnston and Alexander F. Whitney, head of the Brotherhood of Railroad Trainmen, often worked together. They backed Harry S. Truman in his 1940 Senate race, putting up most of the money for his campaign, and in Chicago in 1944 campaigned to make him vice-presidential candidate in Franklin D. Roosevelt's campaign for re-election. Truman was a long-time friend of Whitney but disliked Johnston, whom he called a "damned Republican." In 1943, during World War II (1939-1945), the government seized the railroads. Johnston and Whitney were made labor consultants. Johnston also represented the railroad union of the Combined War Labor Board.

Johnston was a Republican. He endorsed Thomas E. Dewey for President in 1944 and 1948 for his welfare program and opposition to communism. In 1950 he endorsed Senator Robert A. Taft, co-author of the Labor Management Relations Act of 1947, for reelection, citing his opposition to Truman and to communism. Most union leaders were against Taft because of his position on Labor.

Towards the end of 1945 Johnston and the leaders of the other main railroad unions demanded pay increases and a forty-hour work week from the railroad companies, in line with other industries. Negotiations stalled in January 1946. Three of the unions were willing to suspend their demands, but Johnston and Whitney called a strike of the Engineers and Trainmen to start on 16 March 1946. President Truman set up a board to hear the grievances and make recommendations. Negotiations broke down in April, and Johnston and Whitney set 18 May 1946 as the strike date. Whitney's union represented 211,000 trainmen and the BLE represented 78,000 engineers. They could halt all railway traffic nationwide. Truman felt betrayed, writing on 17 May 1946 "Lewis, Whitney, Johnston, Murray and all other labor leaders made me certain promises when I took over. They all lied to me."

The day before the walkout was due Truman seized the railroads by executive order. Johnston and Whitney again agreed to postpone the strike for five days. However, after hearing Truman's compromise pay offer their members voted to go on strike on 23 May 1946. The strike stranded travelers, prevented movement of perishable goods and caused concern that many people in war-devastated Europe would starve if grain shipments were delayed. Truman broadcast an appeal to the strikers to return to work, saying "It is inconceivable that in our democracy any two men should be placed in a position where they can completely stifle our economy and ultimately destroy our country." He threatened to call out the army to end the strike. On 25 May Truman was addressing Congress, calling for drastic anti-strike legislation, when word came that the strikers had accepted his terms and the strike had ended.

== Retirement ==
Alvanley Johnston retired from the BLE in 1950. He was succeeded by James P. Shields. He had married in 1917. His wife died in 1934. Johnston died in his sleep on 17 September 1951 in his home in Shaker Heights, Ohio, a suburb of Cleveland.
