= Frank P. Sargent =

American labor unionist (1851–1908)

Frank Sargent

Commissioner General of Immigration
- In office June 25, 1902 – September 4, 1908
- President: Theodore Roosevelt
- Preceded by: Terence V. Powderly
- Succeeded by: Daniel Keefe

Personal details
- Born: Frank Pierce Sargent; November 18, 1851 East Orange, Vermont, U.S. (now Orange)
- Died: September 4, 1908 (aged 56) Washington, D.C., U.S.
- Party: Republican

Frank Pierce Sargent (November 18, 1851 – September 4, 1908) was an American trade union functionary and government official. Sargent is best remembered as the head of the Brotherhood of Locomotive Firemen and Enginemen for a period of more than 17 years and as the United States Commissioner General of Immigration during the first years of the 20th Century.

== Biography ==
=== Early years ===
Frank P. Sargent was born on November 18, 1851, in the small town of East Orange, Vermont. He was the son of Charles Edwin Sargent, a farmer, and his wife Mary C. Kinney Sargent. Sargent completed his education in a rural district school of Orange County, Vermont at the age of 17 and left for Manchester, New Hampshire to learn photography as an apprentice in a photography shop.

Having learned the trade, Sargent went to work as a photographer himself, plying his trade in Manchester, Philadelphia, and Haverhill, Massachusetts. His health began to fail him, however, so Sargent moved to the Southwestern American state of Arizona, where he joined the U.S. Cavalry. In this capacity Sargent participated in the U.S. Government's ongoing war against the Apache nation from 1879 to 1880.

Sargent served at Fort Apache, Arizona under the command of Captain H.C. Hentig and fought skirmishes against the Victoria band in the summer of 1880 in Arizona and Mexico, including one engagement at Cibicue at which his commanding officer was killed.

With his term of enlistment served, Sargent was discharged from the cavalry in December 1880 and went to work in the rail transport industry as an engine wiper for the Southern Pacific Railroad. After three months in this position, Sargent was promoted to a place as fireman on a construction train, later moving to a similar post on the regular road service.

=== Union career ===
Sargent was initiated into the Brotherhood of Locomotive Firemen (BLF), a relatively new mutual benefit association, on October 20, 1881. He immediately became active in BLF affairs and was soon made Financier of Cactus Lodge, No. 94. He was subsequently elected as a delegate to the BLF's 1882 Annual Convention, held in Terre Haute, Indiana. The following year at the 1883 Denver Convention of the BLF Sargent was elected Vice Grand Master of the brotherhood. He was elevated to the position of Grand Master – head of the BLF – at the Philadelphia Convention of 1885.

Sargent would retain his post as chief of the Brotherhood of Locomotive Firemen through 1902, during which time the organization's membership was broadened and the name changed to the Brotherhood of Locomotive Firemen and Enginemen. The Sargents resided in Terre Haute during the entire time Frank was Grand Master.

In his capacity as BLF chief Sargent played a role in the Burlington Railroad Strike of 1888 as well as the 1894 Great Northern Railroad strike conducted by the American Railway Union headed by Sargent's former BLF associate, Eugene V. Debs.

Sargent was regarded as a conservative voice in union affairs, not prone to aggressiveness in labor disputes – a tendency which gained him the nickname "Safety Valve."

Sargent was an active member of the National Civic Federation as well as a trusted associate of Samuel Gompers of the American Federation of Labor and John Mitchell of the United Mine Workers of America.

=== Later years ===
Sargent was first tapped for government service during the Republican administration of William McKinley, when he declined appointment to head the nation's currency-issuing authority, the Bureau of Engraving and Printing.

At the next such opportunity Sargent answered in the affirmative, however, and in April 1902 he was appointed by President Theodore Roosevelt as Commissioner General of Immigration. In this capacity Sargent stood as a committed opponent of the so-called "open door policy" with regards to immigration.

=== Death and legacy ===
Sargent died in Washington DC on September 4, 1908 as the result of "stomach trouble," coming in the wake of three severe strokes which rendered him partially paralyzed. He was 56 years old at the time of his death. In accordance with his last wishes, Sargent's body was cremated by a local undertaker, with a brief funeral service held the following Sunday.

Sargent was succeeded in his government role by Assistant Commissioner of Immigration Frank H. Larned on an interim basis. His permanent successor, however, was Daniel J. O'Keefe, who served as Commissioner-General from 1909 to 1913.

== Works ==
- "A Short History of the Brotherhood of Locomotive Firemen," in Carroll D. Wright (ed.), Fifth Annual Report of the Commissioner of Labor, 1889: Railroad Labor. Washington: Government Printing Office, 1890; pp. 40–41.
- "Problems of Immigration," Annals of the American Academy of Political and Social Science, vol. 24 (July 1904), pp. 153–155.

Political offices
Preceded by Terence V. Powderly	Commissioner General of Immigration; 1902–1908	Succeeded by Daniel Keefe
