= Buffalo Creek Railroad =

Railroad in Buffalo, New York

Overview
- Parent company: Erie Lackawanna Railway, Lehigh Valley Railroad
- Headquarters: Buffalo, New York
- Reporting mark: BCK
- Dates of operation: January 25, 1869–April 1, 1976
- Successor: Conrail

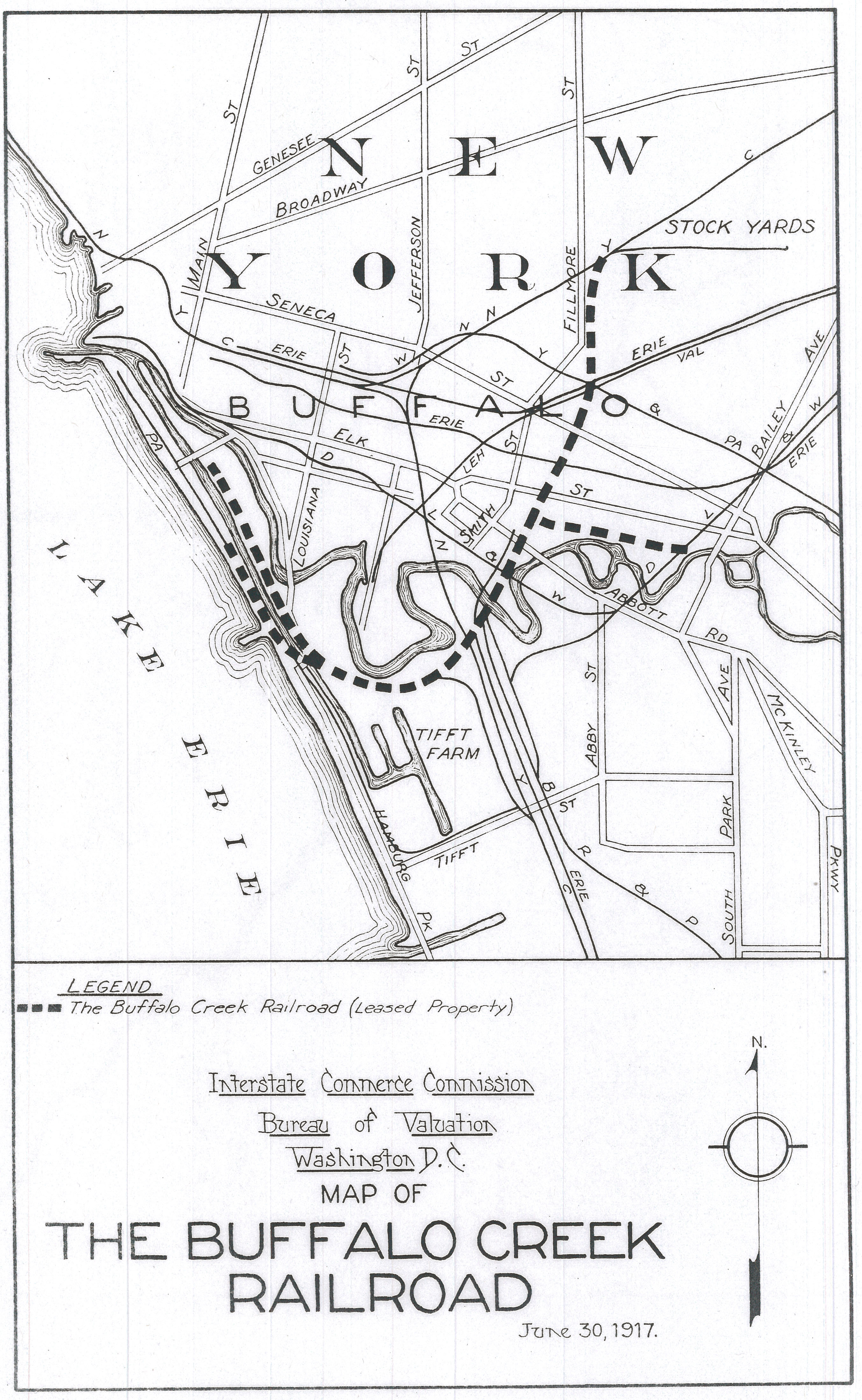
1917 map of the railroad

The Buffalo Creek Railroad was a terminal and switching railroad that operated on the waterfront area of Buffalo, New York. The company was in existence from 1869 to 1976, operating on 5.66 miles with a total trackage of 34.22 miles. It was formed by the Lehigh Valley Railroad and New York, Lake Erie and Western Railroad Company (Erie Lackawanna Railway) which each owned 50% of the company.

The railroad primarily served the grain elevators in present-day 'Silo City' and adjacent area of Buffalo, including that of General Mills. The site was advantageous due to its location on the Buffalo River and the eastern coast of Lake Erie. Before the re-dredging of the Welland Canal in the 1950s, access to Lake Ontario and points further east were limited to large ships coming from in the Midwestern United States. As a consequence Buffalo hosted at one time the world's largest cereal packaging plants, and offloaded, milled, and shipped grain across the eastern United States.

The 'Crik', as it was nicknamed, switched for the grain elevators. The railroad connected with seven major railroads. In addition, the railroad owned a fleet of over 1,700 40-foot boxcars for transporting flour.

The railroad was taken over by Conrail in 1976.
