= Switchman =

Rail transport worker role

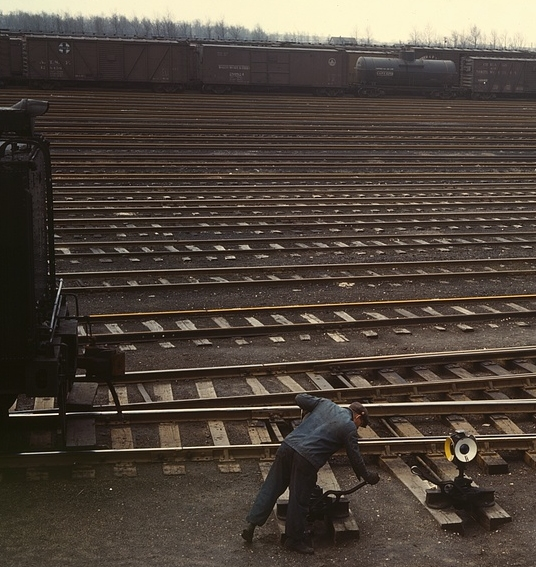
A 1943 color photograph of a switchman at work at the Chicago and North Western Railway's Proviso Yard in Chicago.

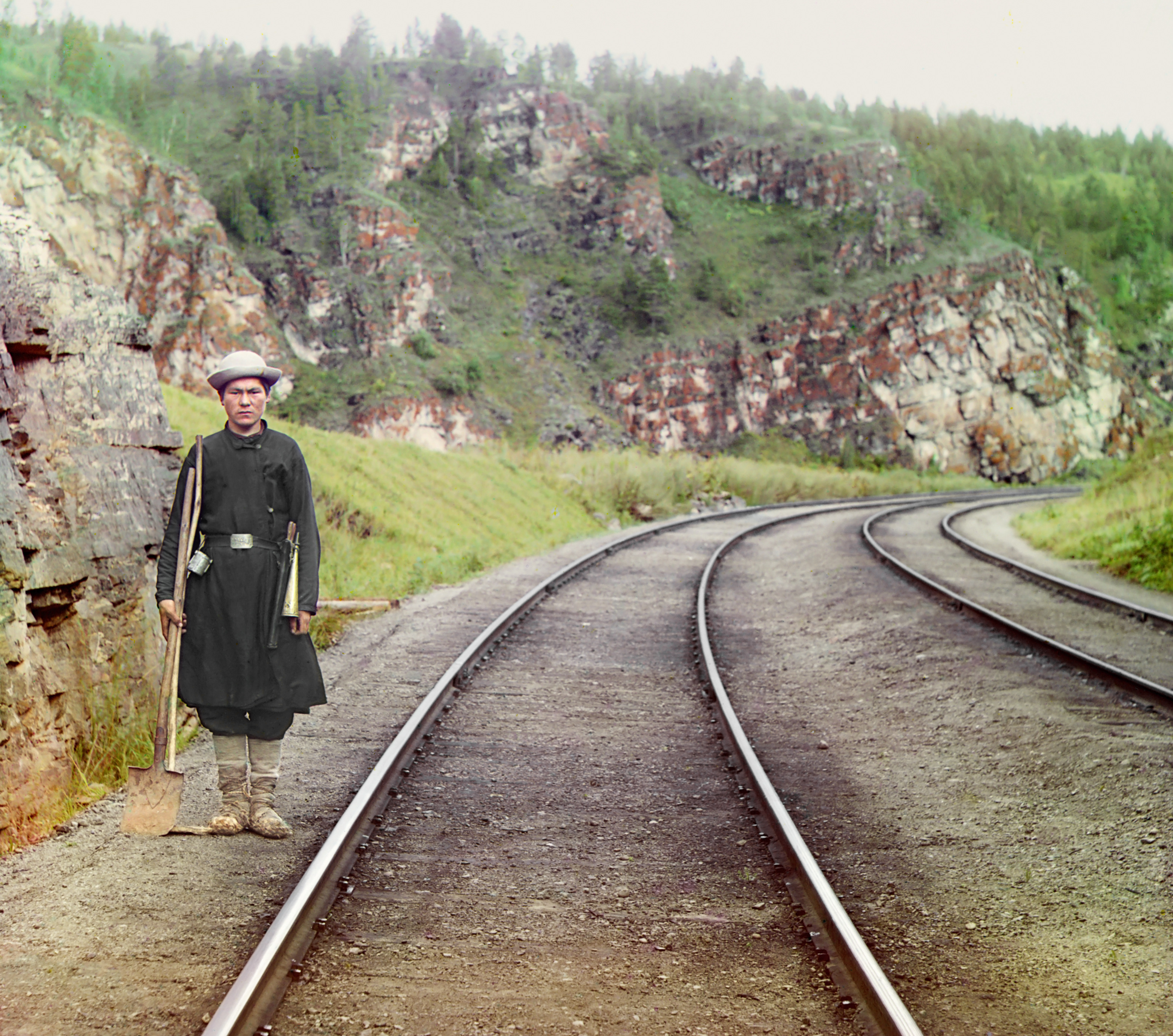
A Russian switchman on the Trans-Siberian Railway, photographed by Sergey Prokudin-Gorsky between 1905 and 1915.

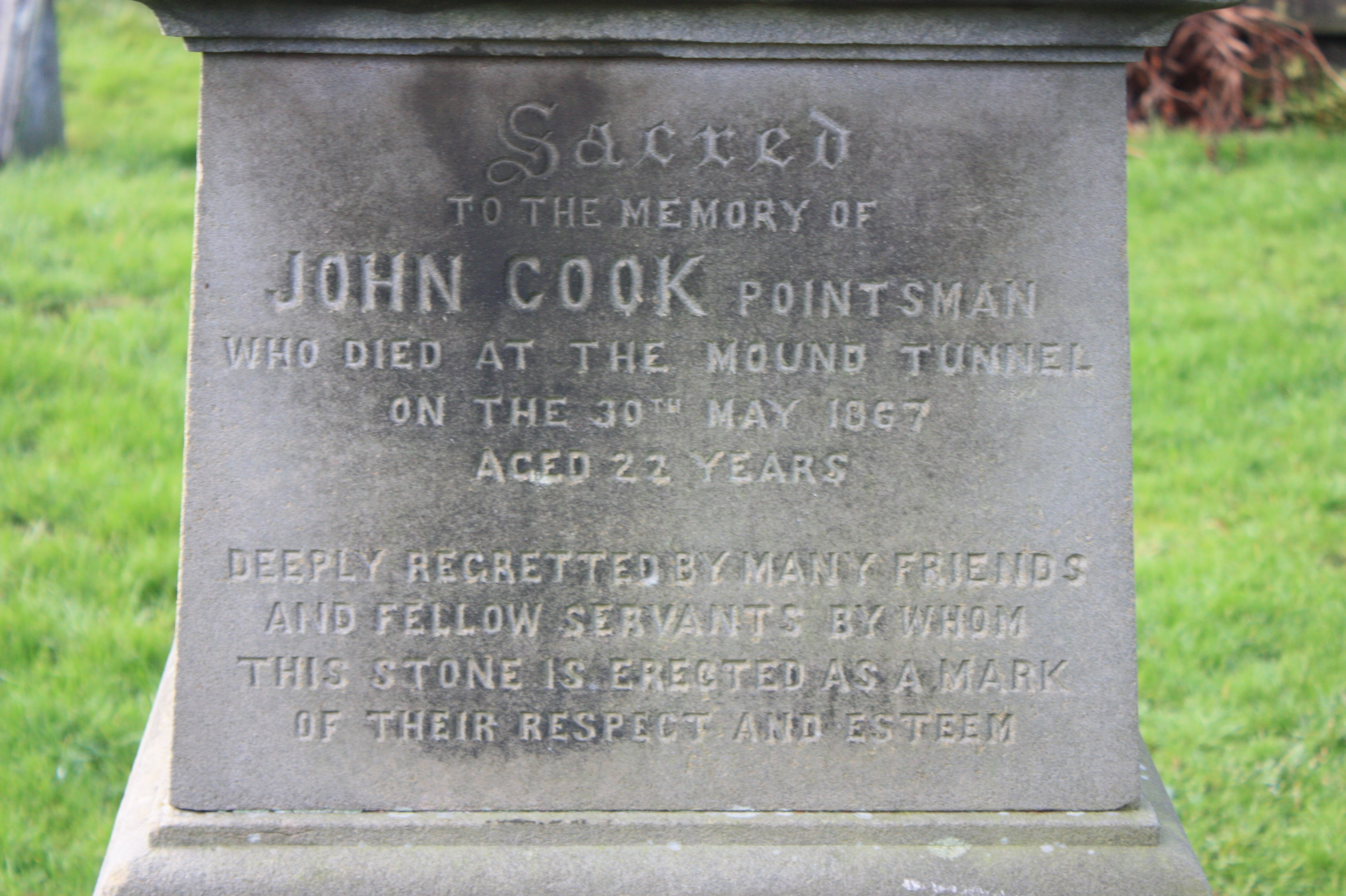
The grave of John Cook, pointsman, Corstorphine, Edinburgh

A switchman (North America) also known as pointsman (British Isles) or yardman (Commonwealth) is a rail transport worker whose original job was to operate various railway switches or points on a railroad. It also refers to a person who assists in moving cars in a railway yard or terminal.

== History ==
Working in railway yards or along sidings, during the pioneering years of rail transport, switchmen as a group suffered large numbers of grievous bodily injuries, including in particular crushing injuries and amputations, owing to their working close to moving trains. An early issue of the American Switchmen's Magazine, in the introduction to a piece on long-serving switchmen, described the dangers:

"The vocation is the most dangerous of any of the different branches of railroading, and that they live for years is only due to their extreme carefulness. The least misstep will often result in crippling a man for life. Their hours of work are long, and the labour very hard, and rain or shine they have to be at their posts. There is no protection for them from the rains of summer, nor the freezing winds and snows of winter. On their efficient work, the great commercial interests of the country largely depend, and only a little carelessness on their part may result in immense damage to the goods in transit, and an error in delivery sometimes causes the loss of an entire consignment of freight, if it happens to be perishable."

Today's American switchman often works as part of three-member switching crew consisting of a Locomotive Engineer, Foreman and Switchman. The Foreman, in charge of the loading of rail cars, is responsible for giving direction to the switchman in order to ensure cars are lined into the correct track and blocked correctly with like cars scheduled to a similar destination, with the engineer in charge of moving the locomotive.

== See also ==
- Railway signalling
- Switchmen's Mutual Aid Association
- Switchmen's Union of North America
- United Transportation Union
