= Brotherhood of Locomotive Engineers and Trainmen =

United States trade union

BLET
- Brotherhood of Locomotive Engineers and Trainmen
- Founded: 8 May 1863
- Location: United States, Canada
- Members: 52,311 (2013)
- Affiliations: International Brotherhood of Teamsters
- Website: www.ble-t.org

The Brotherhood of Locomotive Engineers and Trainmen (BLET) is a labor union founded in Marshall, Michigan, on 8 May 1863 as the Brotherhood of the Footboard. It was the first permanent trade organization for railroad workers in the US. A year later it was renamed the Brotherhood of Locomotive Engineers (B of LE). The B of LE took its present name in 2004 when it became a division of the Rail Conference of the International Brotherhood of Teamsters (IBT).

In the 19th century, the brotherhood generally took a conciliatory approach in dealing with railroad management, preferring to negotiate reasonable demands than to go on strike. The brotherhood was seen as elitist by other railway unions, and sometimes came into conflict during strikes. However, it was respected by its members. By 1925 it had accumulated large investments to support member benefits and pensions. That year it was found that some of these investments were troubled. The executives launched into risky projects in an attempt to recoup their losses, which failed, forcing a change in leadership. The new grand chief engineer, Alvanley Johnston, steered the union until 1950. In 1946 negotiations with the government of Harry S. Truman broke down and the union went on strike for two days, causing nationwide havoc, before coming to an agreement on hours and wages. In 2004 the brotherhood merged with the Teamsters.

== History ==
=== Foundation ===
Cover of the 1867 debut issue of the Monthly Journal, official organ of the B of LE.

An early attempt to form a union for locomotive engineers was made on 6–9 November 1855 at a meeting in Baltimore at which it was agreed to form a "National Protective Association of the Brotherhood of Locomotive Engineers of the United States". Benjamin Hoxie was elected president, and William D. Robinson secretary. The organization held a number of meetings up to the outbreak of the American Civil War in 1861, but did not make much progress. In April 1863 nineteen locomotive engineers met at Robinson's house and decided to form the brotherhood. At a meeting on 8 May 1863 in Detroit the name "Brotherhood of the Footboard" was chosen and Robinson was elected as the first grand chief engineer. It was a mutual aid society which created a variety of accident, death and burial insurance programs for its members.

According to Teamsters General President James P. Hoffa, the BLE was America's earliest labor union. It was the first of the "Big Four" of railroad worker brotherhoods. The others were the Order of Railway Conductors (1868), the Brotherhood of Locomotive Firemen (1873) and the Brotherhood of Railroad Brakemen (1883). In the era after the founding of the Big Four, some sixteen other "brotherhoods" of railroad trades organized. Membership qualifications across trades shifted, and the alliances among the brotherhoods (and their chapters) are not always clear.

=== Expansion (1864–1903) ===
Following a disastrous strike in July 1864 by employees of the Philadelphia and Reading Railroad, in which half of the strikers lost their jobs, the Brotherhood of the Footboard held a convention in Indianapolis on 17 August 1864 in which they changed their name to the Brotherhood of Locomotive Engineers and replaced Grand Chief Engineer Robinson with Charles Wilson. The first, radical, phase of the union was over. In 1873 the Pennsylvania Railroad ordered a reduction of pay, and the engineers went on strike. Charles Wilson publicly criticized their action. The brotherhood called a special meeting in Cleveland on 25 February 1874 at which Wilson was forced to resign and was replaced by P.M. Arthur.

When Arthur took over, the country was entering a financial depression after the Civil War boom. Wages were unstable, working conditions were poor, and strikes were frequent. Arthur was able to prevent wages from falling further through effective negotiation, and the union became more powerful, and was held in good esteem by the union members and the railroad managers. After 1877, the BLE was considered less militant than some other brotherhoods, as well as the Knights of Labor and the American Railway Union. Arthur died unexpectedly on 17 July 1903, and the Grand Assistant Chief A.B. Youngson became head of the union. Youngson was on his deathbed, and died on 31 July 1903.

=== Stone and Prenter (1903–1925) ===
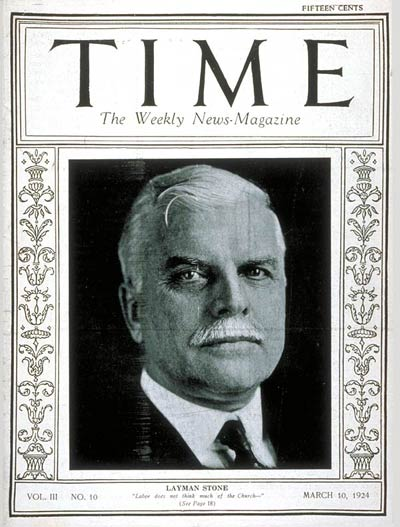
Time magazine cover from 10 March 1924 featuring Warren Stanford Stone

Before dying, Youngson recommended Warren Stanford Stone as his successor, a man who would have great influence in labor politics. Stone headed the union until 1924. Stone believed that if a worker "wants to join a union, all right, but it is contrary to the principles of free government and the Constitution of the United States ... to make him join." Stone and other members of the Brotherhood of Locomotive Engineers became owners of the Coal River Collieries, and Stone became chairman of the board of directors of the mine. A dispute arose with John L. Lewis, president of the United Mine Workers of America. Lewis claimed that Stone was closing mines and throwing miners out of work rather than pay the union scale. Stone refuted this, saying the unions had not renewed their agreement, but the mines were being worked on a cooperative plan. He said "We feel sure there are no better satisfied men employed anywhere than in the Coal River Collieries."

Stone supported the radical Glenn E. Plumb plan for tripartite control of the railway industry by labor, capital and the public, and supported similar plans for other industries. In 1924 Stone was made president, with the grand chief engineer and two vice-presidents reporting to him. Stone died on 12 June 1925 of Bright's disease. At the time of Stone's death the Brotherhood of Locomotive Engineers had majority interests in enterprises with assets of approximately $150,000,000.

Stone was succeeded by William B. Prenter. Around this time it was found that the union's finances were in much poorer shape than had been thought, and the executives decided to undertake risky projects in an attempt to recoup the losses before the problem became public, including developing a resort in Florida. Through mismanagement, these projects ran into difficulty. The problems became visible to the delegates at the June 1927 convention, and Prenter was replaced by Alvanley Johnston

Membership (US records)
View source data.
Finances (US records; ×$1000)
View source data.

=== Johnston (1925–1950) ===
Johnston scrapped the president and vice-president titles and headed the union as grand chief engineer. In 1934 Johnston was convicted of mishandling the funds of the failed Standard Trust Bank of Cleveland. The bank was partly owned by the BLE and he was the chairman. Johnston's conviction was overturned on appeal on the grounds that he was not aware of what was being done. In 1943, during World War II (1939-1945), the government seized the railroads. Johnston and Alexander F. Whitney, head of the Brotherhood of Railroad Trainmen, were made labor consultants. Johnston also represented the railroad union of the Combined War Labor Board.

Towards the end of 1945 Johnston and the leaders of the other main railroad unions demanded pay increases and a 40-hour work week from the railroads, in line with other industries. Negotiations stalled in January 1946. Three of the unions were willing to suspend their demands, but Johnston and Whitney called a strike of the engineers and trainmen to start on 16 March 1946. The strike was delayed when President Truman set up a board to hear the grievances and make recommendations. After lengthy negotiations, union members voted to go on strike on 23 May 1946. The strike stranded travelers, prevented movement of perishable goods and caused concern that many people in war-devastated Europe would starve if grain shipments were delayed. Truman broadcast an appeal to the strikers to return to work, and threatened to call out the army to end the strike. On 25 May the strikers accepted his terms. Johnston retired from the BLE in 1950.

=== Recent years ===
The Brotherhood of Locomotive Engineers was North America's oldest rail labor union when it merged with the Teamsters in 2004. The union sold its downtown Cleveland, Ohio, headquarters (the Standard Building) in July 2014. The union purchased new headquarters in the Cleveland suburb of Independence, Ohio, in March 2015. The union said it would move its headquarters to Independence when its lease at its old property ended in summer 2016.

In April 2024, the union jumped into a public fight at Norfolk Southern Railway over whether to replace the company's leadership. Earlier in the year, some investors proposed firing Norfolk's CEO Alan Shaw and putting in seven new people on the board of directors. The BLET Teamsters publicly came out in support of the plan, saying that "a change at the top is needed" after following the public comments about Shaw and his COO, John Orr. The Teamsters union represents roughly half of Norfolk Southern's unionized employees.

== Locomotive Engineers Mutual Life and Accident Insurance Association ==
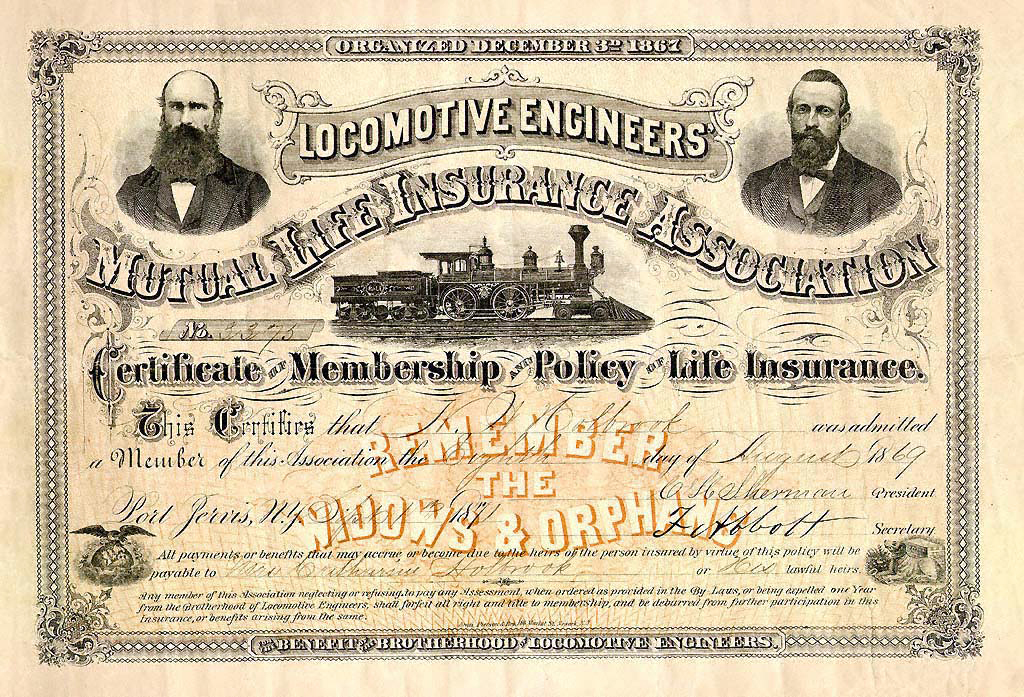
1871 life insurance policy

The BLE had an insurance association, called the Locomotive Engineers Mutual Life and Accident Insurance Association. Founded in 1867, membership in the association was open to members of the Brotherhood of Locomotive Engineers, their wives, widows, children and grandchildren, as well as "persons, their wives and eligible children who are represented under contracts for group insurance coverage between the Brotherhood of Locomotive Engineers and the railroad industry." Local units of the group were called branches and was governed by a quadrennial national convention. The association was headquartered in Cleveland, Ohio and had a membership of 30,000 in 1968 and 20,000 in 1979.

== Presidents ==
1863: W. D. Robinson
1864: Charles Wilson
1874: P. M. Arthur
1903: A. B. Youngson
1903: Warren S. Stone
1924: William B. Prenter
1925: Alvanley Johnston
1950: J. P. Shields
1953: Guy L. Brown
1960: Roy E. Davidson
1964: Perry S. Heath
1969: C. J. Coughlin

Mark L Wallace serves as the national president of the BLET.

== Notable members ==
- Patrick Fennell, known for his railway-inspired poetry
- Patrick Healy (sheepman), transcontinental railway worker, Central Pacific engineer, sheepman, banker
- Casey Jones, folk hero that wrecked his train in 1900.

== See also ==
- Brotherhood of Locomotive Engineers Hall, in Forsyth, Montana, listed on the National Register of Historic Places
- List of American railway unions
- United Transportation Union
- Great Railroad Strike of 1877
- American Railway Union
- Brotherhood of Locomotive Firemen
- Samuel Cochrane
- Union Pacific Railroad Co. v. Brotherhood of Locomotive Engineers
