= International Association of Railway Employees =

- Merged into: United Transportation Unionx
- Founded: December 1934
- Dissolved: 1 September 1970
- Location(s): United States and Canada

The International Association of Railway Employees (IARE) was a union for black railroad workers formed in 1934 at a time when the major railroad brotherhoods restricted membership to whites. Members included conductors, trainmen, engineers, shop mechanics, porters and maintenance-of-way employees. It joined the United Transportation Union in 1970.

== Origins ==
Thomas Redd, a brakeman on the Illinois Central Railroad who had been born soon after the American Civil War ended in 1865, was the prime mover in forming the association. The Association of Colored Railway Trainmen and Locomotive Firemen (ACRT) was founded in 1912, and in 1920 Redd became chairman of its grievance committee. By the late 1920s he was president of its Louisville, Kentucky, chapter. However, he was unable to obtain recognition from the Illinois Central, which would only talk to him as an individual. During the Great Depression of the 1930s black workers faced high unemployment and efforts, sometimes violent, by white workers and unions to displace them.

The Bureau of Labor Statistics's 1936 Handbook of American trade-unions noted that "Negroes are ineligible for membership in most of the standard railroad unions and have therefore formed their own, somewhat sporadically and for the most part locally." Redd decided to try to form a national movement, hoping for strength from numbers. In early 1934 Claude Barnett, head of the Associated Negro Press, was asked for help by the ACRT attorney. Barnett brought in Robert L. Mays to organize a publicity campaign for the planned Association of Railway Employees. Dozens of delegates from local organizations answered Redd's call and met in Chicago in September 1934 to found the association.

== Formation ==
At the first meeting the delegates did not have the authority to organize, but they came to a meeting in Washington in November 1934 with that authority. The IARE was established as a central organization that would protest against contracts that discriminated racially, inequality in seniority treatment and white terrorism. Redd was elected president and Mays secretary. There were 28 members organizations that claimed to represent a total of 15,000 black railroad workers.

== History ==
At the time the 1936 Handbook of American trade-unions was prepared, the Bureau did not treat the International Association of Railway Employees as an established organization, since the undertaking still had a "tentative and formative nature." In the late 1930s the IARE hired civil rights attorney Charles Hamilton Houston to present their case, and he continued to work for them for the next ten years. In the 1940s the IARE helped the Fair Employment Practices Commission (FEPC) in its investigations into discrimination, although during World War II the government chose not to follow up and potentially disrupt the vital railroad industry. The IARE remained relatively small and did not have much power. However, the legal challenges it launched in the 1940s and 1950s over discrimination in employment and union membership were eventually successful.

Arthur Shores became general counsel for the IARE. In 1941 he took on the case of Steele v. Louisville & Nashville Railway Co. in which B. W. Steele, a member of the IARE executive, argued that an agreement between the railway and the Brotherhood of Locomotive Firemen and Enginemen (BLFE) was illegal. A whites-only railroad union could not exclude blacks and then deny them better jobs because they were not union members. In this case, the BLFE had made an agreement with the L&N that whites would get the traditionally dirty and dangerous fireman job on the cleaner and safer diesel engines. Shores worked on the case with Charles H. Houston, who argued it in front of the Supreme Court of the United States in 1944. The case was successful, and the BLFE and L&N had to abandon their agreement. In 1951 an agreement was made by which black firemen retained their jobs on many of the long-haul diesel runs.

In 1969 Marion W. Garnett filed suite on behalf of the International Association of Railroad Employees, still an all-black union, against the Illinois Central Railroad, the Order of Railway Conductors and the Brotherhood of Railroad Trainmen. He charged them with hiring African-Americans as porters and mailhandlers but refusing to give them jobs as conductors, engineers and yard switchmen.

The IARE joined the recently formed United Transportation Union on 1 September 1970.
