= Charles Luna =

American labor leader (1906–1992)

- Charles Luna
- Born: 21 October 1906; Celeste, Texas, United States
- Died: 1 October 1992 (aged 85–86); Dallas, Texas, United States
- Occupation: Labor leader
- Known for: President of the United Transportation Union.

Charles Luna (1906 – 1 October 1992) was president of the Brotherhood of Railroad Trainmen (BRT) from 1963 until 1969. He became the first president of the United Transportation Union, when that organization was formed by merging the BRT and three other railroad unions in 1969.

== Early years ==
Charles Luna was born in Celeste, Texas in 1906. While at high school he worked for the bridge and building department of the Gulf, Colorado and Santa Fe Railway during four summer vacations. After he completed high school in 1928 he joined this company as a switchman in its East Dallas yard.

In 1929 he joined Dallas Lodge 671 of the Brotherhood of Railway Trainmen. In 1936 he was elected a member of the Dallas-area grievance committee of the railway company, and from 1940 to 1946 was chairman of the grievance committee. From 1943 to 1946 he was also a deputy president of the national organization.

In 1947 he started to work for the Brotherhood full-time as General Chairman of the Gulf, Colorado and Santa Fe. In 1949 and 1953 he sat on the national committee to bargain on all members' wages and working conditions. In 1954 he was made vice-president responsible for Denver, Colorado, and later for Dallas, Texas. In the 1960 convention he was elected designated successor to president William Parker Kennedy. In 1961 he moved to headquarters in Cleveland, Ohio, where he chaired the key committee on wages and conditions.

== Union leader ==
Luna became president of the Brotherhood of Railroad Trainmen in 1963. He succeeded W.P. Kennedy, who retired at the end of 1962 at the age of 70. On 1 January 1969 the BRT merged with three other unions to form the United Transportation Union. The others were the Brotherhood of Locomotive Firemen and Enginemen, the Order of Railway Conductors and Brakemen and the Switchmen’s Union of North America. Luna became president of the combined union, with 230,000 members. In 1969 Luna was elected chairman of the Congress of Railway Unions.

In 1971 the UTU Insurance Association assumed the insurance and welfare plans of the brotherhoods who had formed the UTU. The UTU held its first national convention in August 1971 in Miami Beach. Al Chesser, National Legislative Director of the UTU, was elected to succeed Luna, who was retiring.

== Later years ==
In 1970 Luna was chosen by President Richard Nixon to help form the National Railroad Passenger Corporation. This set up the Amtrak inter-city passenger service. Luna served as an Amtrak director for twenty years.

Charles Luna died of a heart attack on 1 October 1992 at his home in Dallas, Texas. Amtrak’s highest safety honor is the Charles Luna Memorial Safety award, which has been presented annually since 1990.

Trade union offices
Preceded by William Parker Kennedy	President of the Brotherhood of Railroad Trainmen; 1963–1969	Succeeded by Union merged
Preceded by Union founded	President of the United Transportation Union; 1969–1971	Succeeded by Al H. Chesser
