= William Parker Kennedy =

Canadian-American labor leader

- Picture from The Miami News article of 23 July 1949 announcing Kennedy's appointment as President of the BRT
- Born: 3 April 1892; Huttonville, Ontario, Canada
- Died: 1968
- Occupation: Labor leader
- Known for: President of the Brotherhood of Railroad Trainmen

William Parker Kennedy (3 April 1892 – 1968) was president of the Brotherhood of Railroad Trainmen (BRT) from 1949 to 1962.

== Early years ==
Kennedy was born in Huttonville, Ontario, near Brampton, on 3 April 1892. When he was ten years old, his family moved to Chicago.

At the age of seventeen he obtained work with the Great Northern Railway as a freight brakeman. He joined the Brotherhood of Railway Trainmen in 1910. In 1911 he moved to Calgary, Alberta, where he worked for the Canadian Pacific Railway as a switchman. At the start of 1912 Kennedy moved to Minneapolis, working as a switchman for the Chicago, Milwaukee and St. Paul Railway. He became president of BRT lodge 625 in Minneapolis.

From 1921 to 1935 he was chairman of the Chicago, Milwaukee and St. Paul Railway grievance committee. In 1935 he was made a full-time union officer, responsible for the northwest United States and for Canada west of Port Arthur, Ontario. He handled representation disputes from 1944 to 1946. At the start of 1947 he was appointed General Secretary and Treasurer.

== Union leader ==
Alexander F. Whitney, president of the union, died of a heart attack on 16 July 1949 at the age of 76. Kennedy succeeded him as president of the Brotherhood of Railroad Trainmen, and held this post until 1963. He was 57 years old when he became president.

On 25 August 1950, President of the United States Harry S. Truman issued an order for the federal government to take control of the 131 major railroads in the United States. The order came three days before the members of the BRT and the Order of Railway Conductors, were scheduled to halt work. Truman had just ordered U.S. troops to intervene in the Korean War, and could not afford to have the railways paralyzed. The strike continued until May 1952, when the Brotherhood of Railroad Trainmen, the Order of Railway Conductors and the Brotherhood of Locomotive Firemen and Enginemen accepted the government's terms and returned to work.

Kennedy predicted that freight yards would become increasingly automated using new electronic technology. The railroads were in good financial condition, so could afford increased levels of investment, and there were large savings to be made. The Brotherhood reached its greatest size in 1956, with 217,176 members, after which railroad employment began to decline.

In 1957 the BRT affiliated with the AFL–CIO and the Canadian Labour Congress. At the 1959 AFL–CIO convention, the question of racial discrimination came up. A. Philip Randolph said the federation should not tolerate segregated locals, even when the members were black and wanted to remain segregated. He was attacked by the organization's president, George Meany, who accused Randolph of trying to suppress the views of the black unionists. Randolph introduced a resolution to eject the Brotherhood of Railroad Trainmen and the Brotherhood of Locomotive Firemen and Enginemen from the AFL-CIO unless they changed their constitutions to allow black members. Kennedy said he would work to eliminate bias from the trainmen's union, and said that there were already over a thousand black members even though its constitution theoretically barred them.

Kennedy supported Senator Harley M. Kilgore in his push for stronger laws for detaining subversives. He wrote to him on behalf of the Brotherhood to express their "deep appreciation of your efforts in Congress to counteract the activities of Communists and other subversive groups."

In 1958 Kennedy declined an invitation from the Teamsters to discuss a unified transportation union. The Brotherhood held a lengthy convention in the Cleveland Music Hall between 4 January 1960 and 18 February 1960. Jimmy Hoffa of the International Brotherhood of Teamsters had representatives trying to influence the delegates to support unification of all labor unions. The combined union of road, rail and airline transport workers would have had immense power, and probably would have been prevented by the government. However, Kennedy was strongly opposed to working with Hoffa.

Kennedy retired at the end of 1962 at the age of 70. President John F. Kennedy sent him a message that was read at his testimonial banquet: "Congratulations for your splendid record as President of the Brotherhood of Railroad Trainmen; and good wishes for many years of enjoyable retirement." Charles Luna succeeded W.P. Kennedy as president in 1963.

== Bibliography ==
- Kennedy, W. P. (1951). 1949-1951 Rule-wage Movement in United States. Brotherhood of Railroad Trainmen.
- Kennedy, W. P. (1953). 1952-53 Wage Movement in Canada. Brotherhood of Railroad Trainmen.
- Gilbert, Henry E.; Kennedy, William Parker (1956). Petition for promulgation and enforcement of rules, standards and instructions for installation, inspection, maintenance and repair of power brakes.
- Kennedy, W. P.; Brotherhood of Railroad Trainmen (1956). Collective Political Action--address by W.P. Kennedy. U.S. Government Printing Office.
- Kennedy, William Parker (1957). Automation in the railroad industry; the twentieth century challenge to management and labor.
- Kennedy, W. P. (1960). Meeting the people's needs for modern railroad transportation. Brotherhood of Railroad Trainmen.
- Kennedy, W. P. (1960). Suburban rail transportation can save our cities. Brotherhood of Railroad Trainmen.

Trade union offices
| Preceded by Alexander F. Whitney | President of the Brotherhood of Railroad Trainmen; 1949–1962 | Succeeded by Charles Luna |
