= Austin B. Garretson =

American labor leader

Austin Bruce Garretson
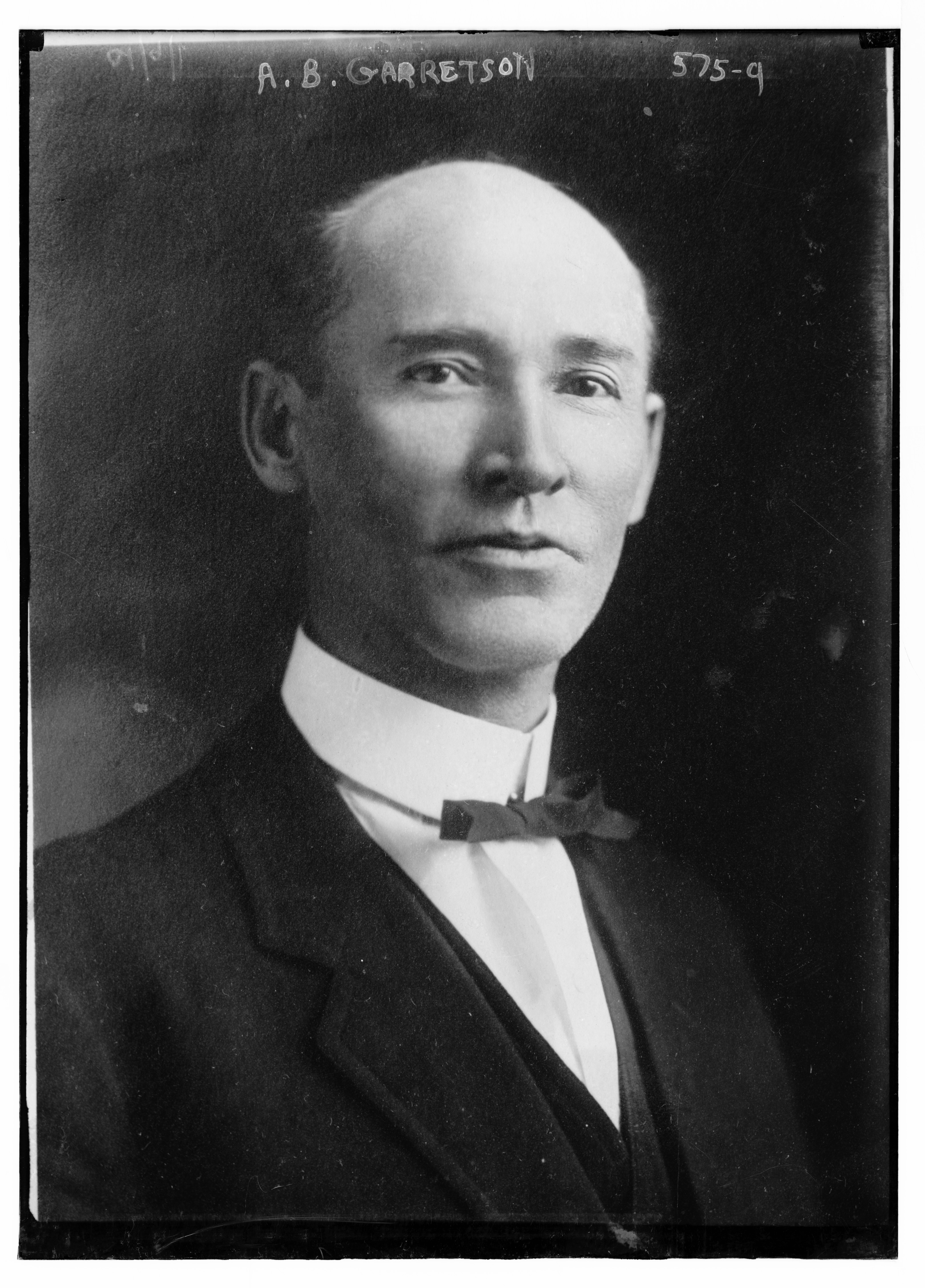
- Born: 4 September 1856; Winterset, Iowa
- Died: 27 February 1931 (aged 74); Cedar Rapids, Iowa
- Occupation: Labor leader

Austin Bruce Garretson (4 September 1856 – 27 February 1931) was an American labor leader who was head of the Order of Railway Conductors from 1906 to 1919. He gained national prominence in 1916 when he averted a nationwide railroad strike in exchange for an eight-hour day with time-and-a-half overtime pay.

== Early years ==
Austin Bruce Garretson was born in Winterset, Iowa on 4 September 1856. His father was Nathan Garretson, a lawyer and a Quaker who firmly believed in the importance of practical skills. After Austin had been educated at the school in Osceola, Iowa his father apprenticed him as a wheelwright. He obtained a job as a brakeman on New Virginia line, later part of the Chicago, Burlington and Quincy Railroad. After four years Garretson became a conductor, and held this post until 1881. He then moved to Denison, Texas, where he found work with the Missouri, Kansas and Texas Railroad.

In 1884 Garretson became a member of the Lone Star Division 53 of the Order of Railway Conductors, and became active in union work. In 1885 he was the local's delegate to the 18th national convention of the Order, held in Louisville, Kentucky. In 1887 he was elected grand senior conductor, unpaid, and from then until 1919 held office in the union. In 1888 he moved to San Luis Potosí in Mexico, working for the National Railroad of Mexico, and then to Jimulco where he worked for the Mexican Central Railway. He returned to the United States in 1889.

In 1890 Garretson was one of the leaders of the progressive faction that transformed the Order of Railway Conductors from a fraternal and beneficiary association into one that protected its members and negotiated for better pay and conditions. That year Edgar E. Clark was elected Grand Chief Conductor of the Order. Clark would head the union until 1906. In 1894 Austin B. Garretson was elected grand senior conductor of the Order, while C. H. Wilkins was assistant grand chief conductor. Garretson and Wilkins later exchanged positions. Garretson was also president of the union's mutual benefit department. He was a member of the executive committee of the American Railroad Employees and Investors association, and a member of the National Civic Federation.

== Union leader ==
On 1 September 1906 Austin B. Garretson was elected Grand Chief Conductor of the Order of Railway Conductors, in succession to Clark. His title was changed to president in 1907. Garretson found the job made heavy demands on his time, as locals that were unskilled at negotiation increasingly called on the union executives for assistance. In 1907 the ORC and other railroad unions managed to get Congress to pass laws that limited to sixteen the maximum number of hours a railroader could work in one day.

Garretson was appointed a member of the U.S. Commission on Industrial Relations (USCIR) created by the United States Congress on 23 August 1912 to investigate the causes of industrial violence. He was one of three labor leaders nominated by President William Howard Taft, the others being John Brown Lennon, treasurer of the American Federation of Labor (AFL) and James O'Connell, head of the Metal Trades department of the AFL. Both of the AFL members were close allies of Samuel Gompers who had been pushed out of their union offices by socialists. When Woodrow Wilson succeeded Taft as President in 1913 he changed many of Taft's appointments, but retained the labor leaders. Wilson selected the mid-western labor lawyer Frank P. Walsh as his choice of chairman. Walsh was confirmed by the Senate on 19 September 1913. Walsh noted that Garretson represented "the most conservative labor organization of the country."

The USCIR sat through 154 days of public hearings between the fall of 1913 and the spring of 1915. It found huge imbalances in wealth in the nation, with the poorer two thirds of the population owned just 2% of the wealth, while the top 2% owned 60% of the wealth. In November 1915 Walsh announced that he was forming a private Committee on Industrial Relations (CIR) with the goal of bringing together "leaders of every school of economic belief, from the so-called most conservative to the so-called wildest radical" to sound "one harmonious note for justice to labor". Garretson was again appointed, as were Lennon and O'Connell, but the new committee included a wider range of progressives and activists.

In the late summer of 1916 Garretson played a leading role in negotiations in which railway workers won the right to an eight-hour day and time-and-a-half overtime pay with the passage of the Adamson Act. He was chairman of the committee of the four brotherhoods of engineers, firemen, brakemen and conductors that negotiated for the eight-hour day, handling the talks firmly but tactfully. After the end of World War I, Garretson was a supporter of the Plumb Plan for government ownership of the railroads. This would have given labor considerable say in the way the railroads were operated.

Garretson retired in 1919, and gave up his editorship of the Railway Conductor. He was appointed President Emeritus and Advisor to the Order of Railway Conductors until his death. Austin Bruce Garretson died at Cedar Rapids, Iowa on 27 February 1931.

== Beliefs ==
Garretson was against any restrictions on the right to strike, but believed in avoiding use of that right where possible. He was opposed to militant unionism and violence. He was a Christian, and would often use Biblical quotations to support his case during negotiations. Garretson thought that the public had an interest and a right to be represented on boards of arbitration, but only where there was some danger to the public.

In 1913 Garretson said of mediation,

The success or failure of any act of this character will always depend upon the personality of the men who administer it, and unless these men develop the qualities that are necessary for successfully acting the part of mediators the act is not worth the ink it took to print it. ... it is the personal qualities of those men that have contributed so largely, first, to successful settlement, there the mediator is able to make a successful settlement on account of the peaceful qualities that invoke confidence–absolute–on both parties, because mediation is absolutely founded on good faith and confidence, and no other features will ever make it a success.
