= Adamson Act =

United States federal law concerning the work week and overtime pay for rail workers

- Long title: An Act to establish an eight-hour day for employees of carriers engaged in interstate and foreign commerce, and for other purposes.
- Nicknames: Eight-Hour Workday Act
- Enacted by: the 64th United States Congress
- Effective: September 3, 5, 1916

Citations
- Public law: Pub. L. 64–252
- Statutes at Large: 39 Stat. 721

Legislative history
- Introduced in the House as H.R. 17700 by William C. Adamson (D-GA) on September 1, 1916; Committee consideration by House Interstate and Foreign Commerce, House Rules; Passed the House on September 1, 1916 (241-57); Passed the Senate on September 2, 1916 (47-28); Signed into law by President Woodrow Wilson on September 3, 5, 1916

The Adamson Act was a United States federal law passed in 1916 that established an eight-hour workday, with additional pay for overtime work, for interstate railroad workers.

== History ==
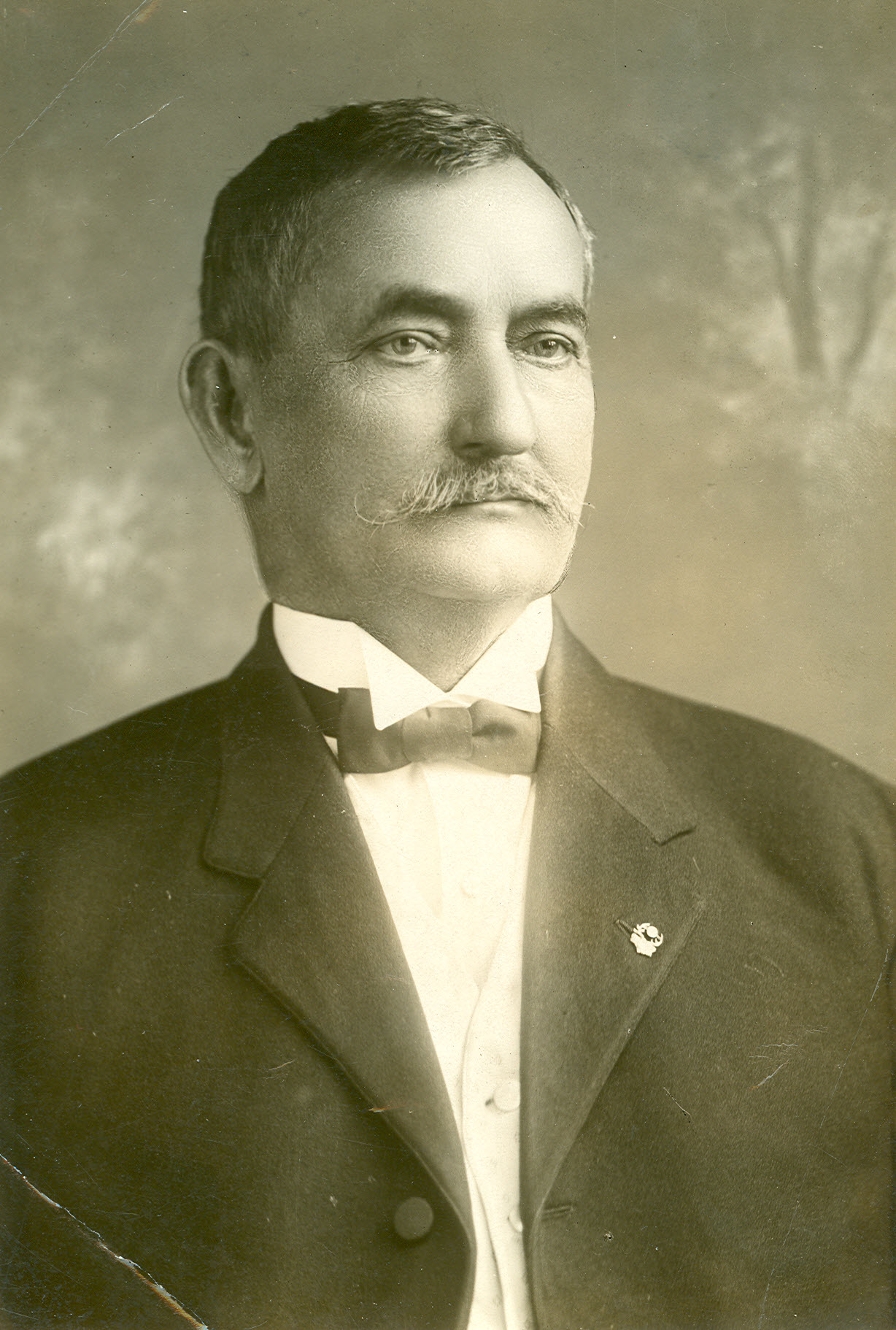
Rep. William C. Adamson (D—GA-4), the sponsor of the Adamson Act.

The terms that were embodied in the act were negotiated by a committee of the four railroad labor brotherhoods of engineers, firemen, brakemen and conductors, chaired by Austin B. Garretson. Garretson was the respected leader of the conductors' union. He had formerly been a member of the President's Commission on Industrial Relations, investigating the causes of industrial violence. Congress passed the Act in order to avoid a nationwide strike.

Named for Georgia representative William C. Adamson, this was the first federal law that regulated the hours of workers in private companies. The United States Supreme Court upheld the constitutionality of the Act in 1917. When the railroads refused to abide by the law while their court challenge to its constitutionality was pending, the railway unions began preparing again to strike. The Supreme Court's decision brought the employers around, however, and they entered into settlement discussions concerning implementation of the law.

The unions' success spurred other railway employees not covered by the Act to press similar demands. Their negotiations were leading to a strike when President Woodrow Wilson, exercising the authority granted by the Army Appropriations Act of 1916, took over operation of the railroads on December 26, 1917. (See United States Railroad Administration.)

== Terms ==
The Act, formerly codified at 45 U.S.C. §§ 65, 66, was repealed in 1996 when it provided:

§65. Establishment of eight hour day

Eight hours shall, in contracts for labor and service, be deemed a day's work and the measure of standard of a day's work for the purpose of reckoning the compensation for services of all employees who are now or may hereafter be employed by any common carrier by railroad, except railroads independently owned and operated not exceeding one hundred miles in length, electric street railroads, and electric interurban railroads, which is subject to the provisions of subtitle IV of Title 49, and who are now or may hereafter be actually engaged in any capacity in the operation of trains used for the transportation of persons or property on railroads, except railroads independently owned and operated not exceeding one hundred miles in length, electric street railroads, and electric interurban railroads, from any State or Territory of the United States or the District of Columbia to any other State or Territory of the United States or the District of Columbia, or from one place in the United States to an adjacent foreign country, or from any place in the United States through a foreign country to any other place in the United States: Provided, That the above exceptions shall not apply to railroads though less than one hundred miles in length whose principal business is leasing or furnishing terminal or transfer facilities to other railroads, or are themselves engaged in transfers of freight between railroads or between railroads and industrial plants.

§66. Penalty for violation

Any person violating any provision of section 65 of this title shall be guilty of a misdemeanor and upon conviction shall be fined not less than $100 and not more than $1,000, or imprisoned not to exceed one year, or both.

The language of the Adamson Act is now recodified, with only minor changes, at 49 U.S.C. §§ 28301, 28302.
