= Alexander F. Whitney =

American labor leader

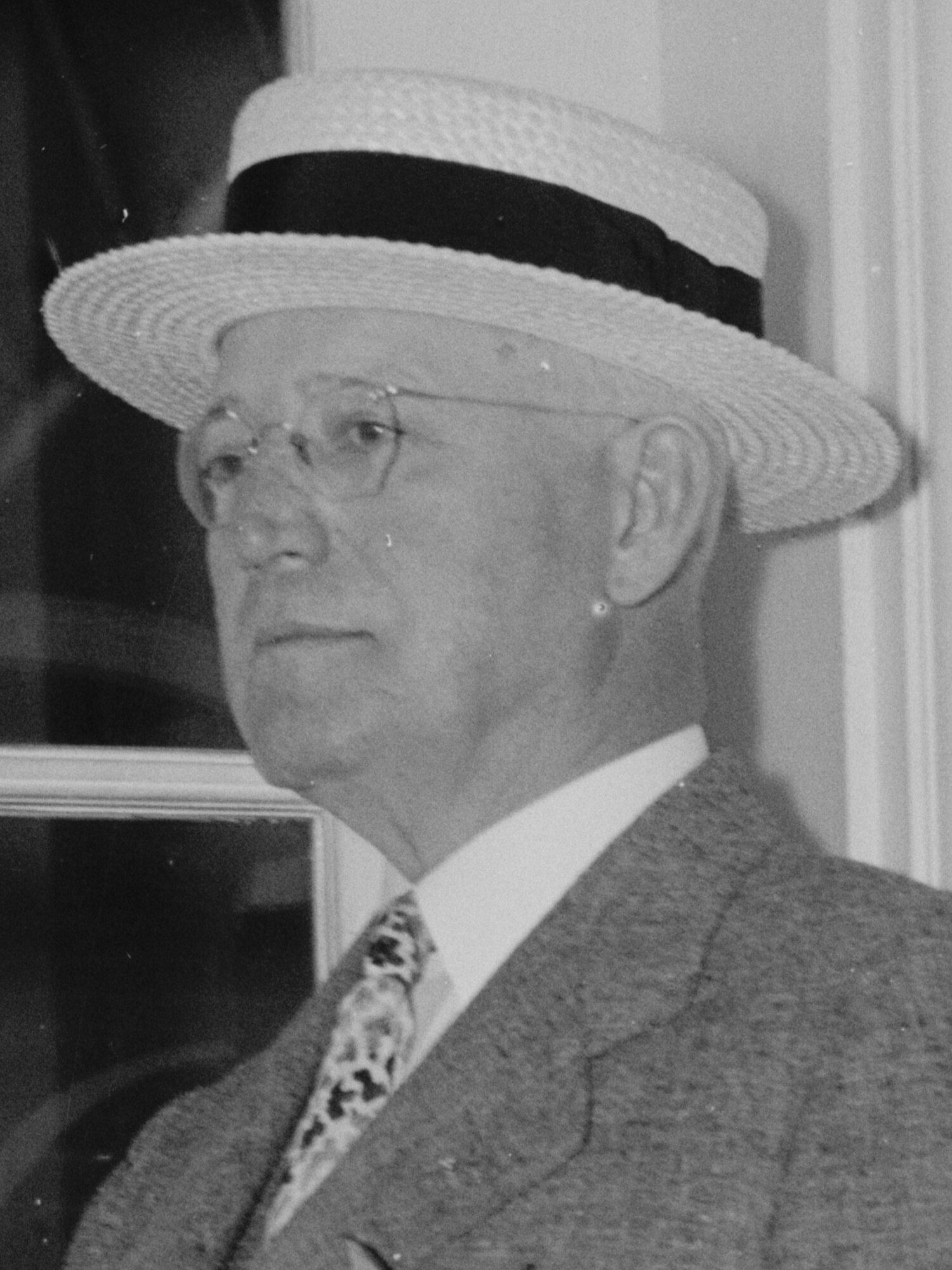
- Whitney in 1938

President of the Brotherhood of Railroad Trainmen
- In office July 1, 1928 – July 16, 1949
- Preceded by: William Granville Lee
- Succeeded by: William Parker Kennedy

Personal details
- Born: 1873 Iowa, U.S.
- Died: July 16, 1949 (aged 76)
- Occupation: Labor leader

Alexander F. Whitney (1873 – July 16, 1949) was an American railway worker who became president of the Brotherhood of Railroad Trainmen (BRT). He was an influential labor leader during the Great Depression and World War II, and in the years immediately following the war. He was the principal leader of a two-day railroad strike in May 1946 that paralyzed the nation.

== Early years ==
Alexander E. Whitney was born in Iowa in 1873. In 1888 he started to work for Illinois Central Railroad. The Brotherhood of Railway Trainmen (BRT) was organized on September 23, 1883, and later moved its headquarters to Cleveland, Ohio. The BRT restricted membership to whites. Whitney joined the Brotherhood in 1898. He was appointed a vice president in 1907. Whitney was elected president of the Brotherhood on July 1, 1928. He succeeded William Granville Lee.

== Depression era labor leader ==
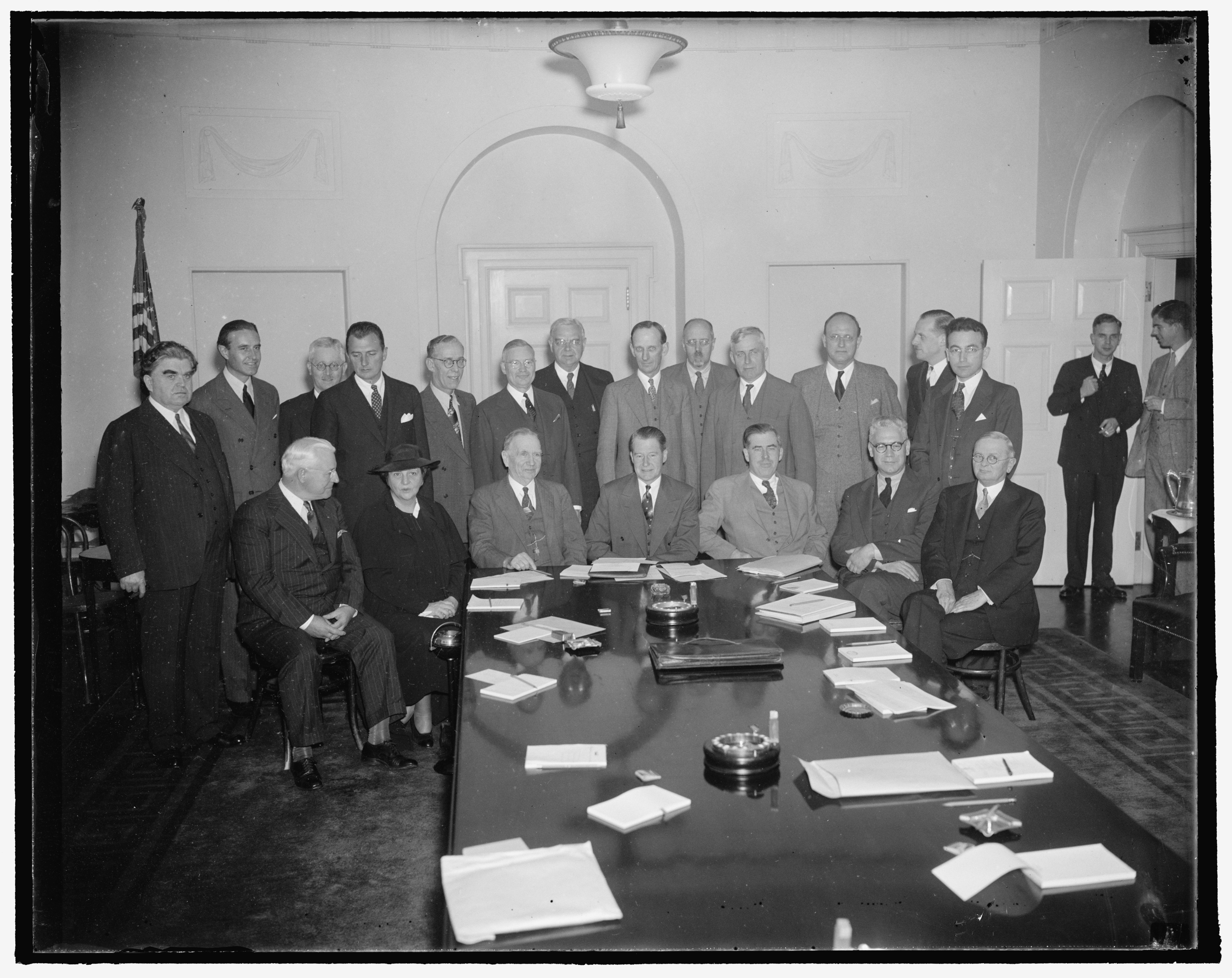
Whitney (seated, far left) and other labor leaders meet with Unemployment Census Administrator John D. Biggers (seated, center), September 27, 1937

Whitney took office at the start of the Great Depression. A Department of Labor study of veteran railway employees showed that between July 1929 and April 1933 two thirds reported that their earnings had dropped by at least 20%, and two fifths said earnings had dropped by 30% or more. This did not count workers who had lost their jobs. By the spring of 1933 the national unemployment rate was 25%. However, Whitney and other labor leaders were opposed to Roosevelt's Civilian Conservation Corps (CCC), a government relief program that provided simple jobs paying $1 per day. He said the CCC, "would place Government's endorsement upon poverty at a bare subsistence level."

Whitney soon became an important public figure, representing the trainmen in many discussions with government and business. During his tenure the Brotherhood of Railway Trainmen grew to 215,000 members. From 1932 to 1934 Whitney was chairman of the Railway Labor Executives' Association. David B. Robertson of the Brotherhood of Locomotive Firemen and Enginemen stepped down in 1932 to devote more time to his union, and Whitney was elected his successor. In 1932 Whitney was among the labor leaders whom the American Federation of Labor was considering endorsing for the position of Secretary of Labor in Roosevelt's government, although Daniel J. Tobin of the Teamsters came to be favored. In the end the president selected Frances Perkins, who took office on March 5, 1933.

After President Franklin D. Roosevelt took office in 1933, he appointed a committee to draw up new legislation for the railroads. Their draft included various measures to improve efficiency. On April 3, 1933 Whitney said the plan could throw from 50,000 to 350,000 men out of work, and would violate contracts related to security of employment. He called for guarantees that the government would ensure absorptive employment, consult with the unions on any changes and prevent carriers from interfering with labor's right to organize. The Emergency Railroad Transportation Act of June 16, 1933 essentially met these conditions, and was seen by the union leaders as a great victory.

In September 1933 Whitney attended a conference in Chicago organized by the League for Independent Political Action, and was one of the signatories to the call for a new political order. It said "We the masses of the people must rise up and win economic and political control. We must organize to establish a new social order, a scientifically planned system. We must own and control the means of production and distribution." The Farmer-Labor Political Federation was founded at the conference, headed by Thomas Ryum Amlie. Despite this radical position, Amlie was strongly opposed to Communism, and communists were not welcome in the federation.

In 1935 Whitney was a co-sponsor of the Railroad Retirement Act.

At times, the BRT came into conflict with other unions. Thus, in 1937 Whitney informed mayor Fiorello La Guardia of New York City that the BRT planned to start organizing Independent Subway System (ISS) motormen and conductors. At first, LaGuardia said he had no objection. Then it emerged that the Brotherhood of Locomotive Firemen and Enginemen was also thinking of organizing the ISS workers, and that the non-segregated Amalgamated Association of Street Railway and Motor Coach Employees might be more appropriate given the number of black ISS conductors.

== World War II ==
Whitney and Alvanley Johnston, leader of the Brotherhood of Locomotive Engineers (BLE), often worked together. They backed Harry S. Truman in his 1940 Senate race, putting up most of the money for his campaign. Truman was a long-time friend of Whitney but disliked Johnston, whom he called a "damned Republican." In 1943, during World War II (1939-1945), the government seized the railroads. Johnston and Whitney were made labor consultants.

Whitney favored James F. Byrnes as vice-presidential candidate in Franklin D. Roosevelt's 1944 campaign for re-election, until it became clear that Roosevelt preferred Truman. He wrote to a colleague on July 12, 1944, "our friend, Jimmy Byrnes ... will not only strengthen the ticket if nominated ... but [is] a man who will fill this high office with dignity." In the 1944 Democratic National Convention in Chicago, he threw his weight behind Truman.

== 1945-46 Strike ==
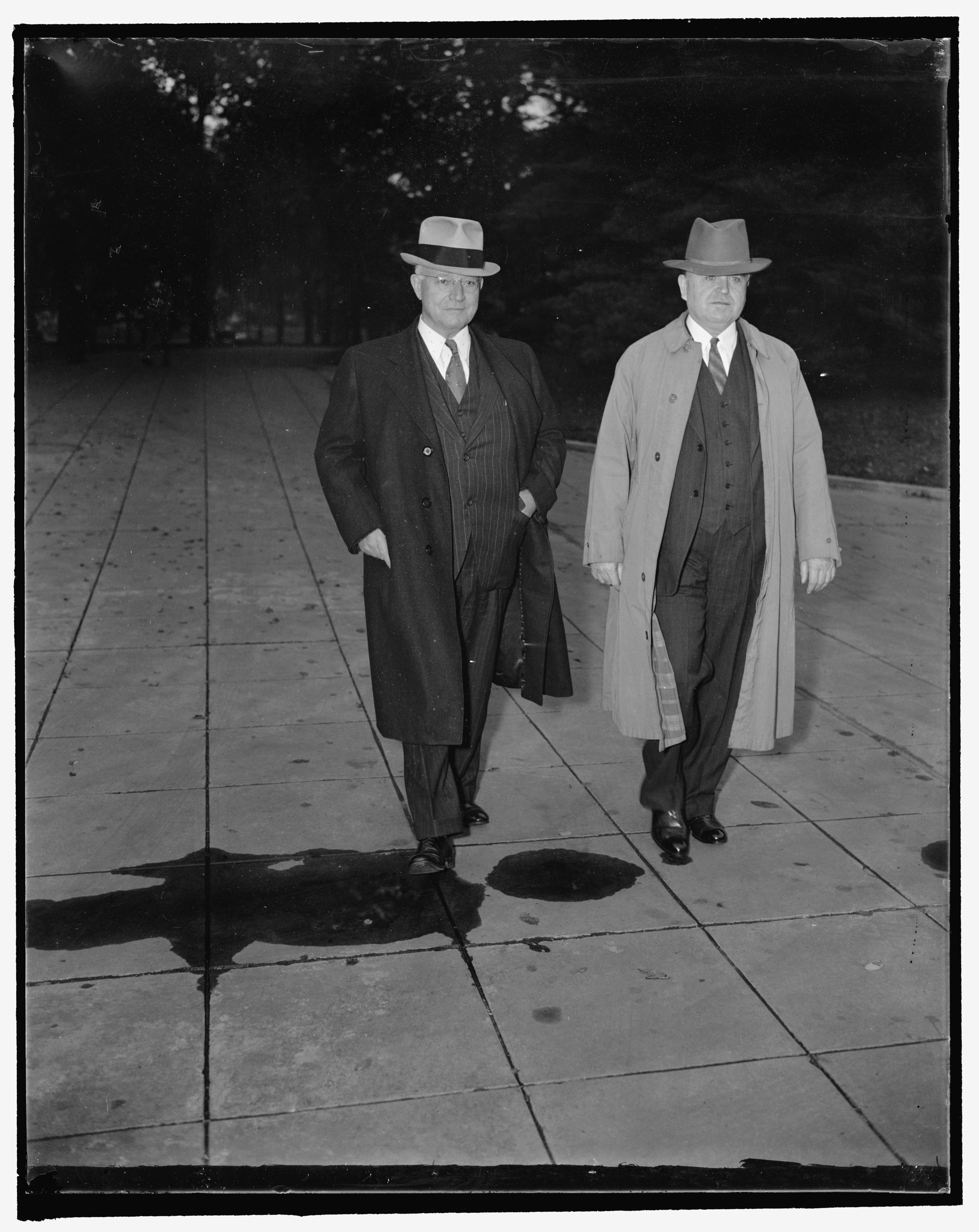
Whitney (left) and CIO President John L. Lewis, September 27, 1937

After the war ended, towards the end of 1945 Whitney and the leaders of the other main railroad unions demanded pay increases and a forty-hour work week from the railroad companies, in line with other industries. Negotiations stalled in January 1946. Three of the unions were willing to suspend their demands, but Johnston and Whitney called a strike of the Engineers and Trainmen to start on March 16, 1946. President Truman set up a board to hear the grievances and make recommendations. Negotiations broke down in April, and Whitney and Johnston set May 18, 1946 as the strike date. Whitney's union represented 211,000 trainmen and Johnston represented 78,000 engineers. They could halt all railway traffic nationwide. Truman felt betrayed, writing on May 17, 1946 "Lewis, Whitney, Johnston, Murray and all other labor leaders made me certain promises when I took over. They all lied to me."

Three days before the deadline for the strike, Truman met Whitney and Johnston in the Oval Office. He told them, "If you think I'm going to sit here and let you tie up this whole country, you're crazy as hell." Whitney apologized but said "We've got to go through with this, Mr. President. Our men are demanding it." Truman responding by saying that if the labor leaders did not make a settlement within two days he would take over the railroads. The day before the walkout was due Truman seized the railroads by executive order as he had promised. Whitney and Johnston again agreed to postpone the strike for five days.

However, after hearing Truman's compromise pay offer their members voted to go on strike on May 23, 1946. The strike stranded travelers, prevented movement of perishable goods and caused concern that many people in war-devastated Europe would starve if grain shipments were delayed. Truman broadcast an appeal to the strikers to return to work, saying "It is inconceivable that in our democracy any two men should be placed in a position where they can completely stifle our economy and ultimately destroy our country." He threatened to call out the army to end the strike. On May 25, Truman was addressing Congress, calling for drastic legislation under which strikers could be drafted into the army, when word came that the strikers had accepted his terms and the strike had ended.

== Later career ==
In the immediate aftermath of the May 1946 strike Whitney was reported to have said the Brotherhood would use all of its capital of $47 million to defeat Truman if he sought reelection. After Henry A. Wallace was dismissed from the Truman administration in September 1946, Whitney was among the labor leaders who considered supporting him as a presidential candidate in the 1948 election. Later, Whitney and most other labor leaders abandoned Wallace as being too far to the left.

Whitney was a bitter opponent of Senator Robert A. Taft, saying that his Labor Management Relations Act of 1947 would put the U.S. "one step from Hitler's form of government." After the Taft-Hartley bill was passed despite Truman's veto, on July 20, 1947 Whitney said that Truman's veto of the bill had "vindicated him in the eyes of labor". He ruled out Wallace, saying a third party was now "out of the question." A spokesman for the Brotherhood said "our Brotherhood will throw all its resources behind President Truman and his Administration in an effort to elect a Congress which will back the President's liberal program."

Alexander F. Whitney died of a heart attack on July 16, 1949 at the age of 76. He was succeeded as president of the BRT by William Parker Kennedy.

Trade union offices
| Preceded by William Granville Lee | President of the Brotherhood of Railroad Trainmen; 1928–1949 | Succeeded by William Parker Kennedy |
