= Alfred H. Chesser =

American labor union leader (1914–2016)

Alfred Harold Chesser (February 26, 1914 – September 25, 2016) was an American labor union leader.

Born on a farm near Sedalia, Missouri, Chesser grew up in Hughesville, Missouri, then back in Sedalia. He became a traveling salesman for American Disinfecting, and after a year as a clerk, moved to Wichita, Kansas to become a grocery store manager. In 1941, he became a brakeman on the Atchison, Topeka and Santa Fe Railway, and he soon moved to Amarillo, Texas.

Chesser joined the Brotherhood of Railroad Trainmen, and in 1945 was elected as secretary-treasurer of his local. In 1952, he was elected as secretary of the union's Texas legislative board, and then in 1956 as the board's full-time chair. He moved to Washington, D.C. in 1962 when he became the union's national legislative director. The union merged into the new United Transportation Union (UTU) in 1968, with Chesser retaining his role. He was elected as president of the union in 1972, also become a vice-president of the AFL-CIO, and chair of the Congress of Railway Unions.

As leader of the UTU, Chesser championed safety legislation, and the formation of Conrail. He retired in 1979, becoming president emeritus of the union, and advising on workplace safety and legislative representation. In 2001, he received the Eugene V. Debs Award.

Chesser died in 2016, at the age of 102.

Trade union offices
Preceded by Charles Luna	President of the United Transportation Union; 1972–1979	Succeeded by Fred Hardin
Awards
Preceded by Michael Sullivan	Winner of the Eugene V. Debs Award; 2001	Succeeded by Julian Bond
