= Frank W. Arnold =

- Born: October 5, 1851; Columbus, Ohio
- Died: January 9, 1917 (aged 65); St. Luke's Hospital, Chicago
- Burial place: Green Lawn Cemetery, Columbus, Ohio
- Known for: Grand Master and Secretary-Treasurer of the Brotherhood of Locomotive Firemen

Frank W. Arnold (1851–1917) was an American trade union functionary, lawyer, businessman, and government employee. He is best remembered as a Grand Master and Secretary-Treasurer of the Brotherhood of Locomotive Firemen (B of LF).

Arnold headed the B of LF from 1879 to 1885, leaving to enter a career in business and law. He would return as Secretary-Treasurer of the B of LF in 1892, holding the post until the end of 1903. At the time of his death, Arnold worked as an Examiner for the United States Interstate Commerce Commission.

== Biography ==
=== Early years ===
Frank W. Arnold was born in Columbus, Ohio, on October 5, 1851. He was educated in the public schools of that community. Arnold graduated from Columbus High School in 1866, when he was 15 years old.

=== Railway career ===
Portrait drawing of Frank W. Arnold from 1888

Following Frank's graduation in Columbus, the Arnold family moved to Louisville, Kentucky, where Arnold gained an entry-level position with the Louisville City Railway Company as an engine starter. He would work for that company for two and a half years, advancing over time from starter to the superintendent of lines.

At the age of 18 Arnold left home, returning to Columbus to take a position as a locomotive brakeman for the Piqua Railroad, a railway subsequently absorbed into the Chicago, St. Louis & Pittsburg Railroad. He found the job boring, however, and in 1871 quit to open a cigar and tobacco shop in Columbus. He abandoned this to accept an offer to join a business in St. Louis, Missouri, in 1872, but the business was wiped out by the Panic of 1873, sending Arnold home to Columbus again.

In 1873 Arnold returned to firing a locomotive on the Chicago, St. Louis & Pittsburg, remaining in that position until the end of 1876. He joined Franklin Lodge No. 9 of the Brotherhood of Locomotive Firemen (B of LF) in February 1877 and remained an active member of the organization for the rest of his life. While working on the railroad, he studied law in his spare time, passing the Illinois State Bar in February 1879.

Arnold attended the 1879 national convention of the organization in Chicago and was here elected Grand Master (President) of the organization, a position which he held until 1885. When Arnold was first elected as Grand Master the position was unpaid and purely honorary, becoming a paid position in later years as the financial position of the B of LF improved.

After passing the Ohio Bar, Arnold began the practice of law in Columbus. He ran for Columbus City Prosecutor and won election in 1880. He was also involved in business pursuits in Columbus during the decade of the 1880s.

Arnold married the former Henrietta Cox, of Columbus, in 1888.

In September 1892, Eugene V. Debs resigned his position as Grand Secretary and Treasurer of the B of LF and Arnold was selected by the delegates to the 16th National Convention, held in Cincinnati, as Debs' successor. During his tenure as secretary-treasurer, Arnold helped the union move its headquarters in 1894 to Peoria, Illinois, where he oversaw an increase in the union's membership from less than 21,000 members in 1894 to nearly 41,000 members in 1902. Arnold would remain at this post until his resignation in November 1903, which took effect January 1, 1904.

=== Later years ===
After leaving his well-paid position as a functionary of the B of LF, Arnold took a job as a representative of a large jewelry firm, eventually leaving Chicago to return to Peoria, Illinois, where he took a position as Secretary of the town's Commercial Club.

Arnold left the Commercial Club to take a position as examiner for the United States Interstate Commerce Commission, a job which he would hold until the time of his death.

=== Death and legacy ===
Frank Arnold died of cancer at St. Luke's Hospital in Chicago on January 9, 1917. He was 65 years old at the time of his death.

Arnold's body was transported back to his native Columbus and he was buried at Green Lawn Cemetery, located just west of the city.
