= Commission on Industrial Relations =

1912 US Congressional commission

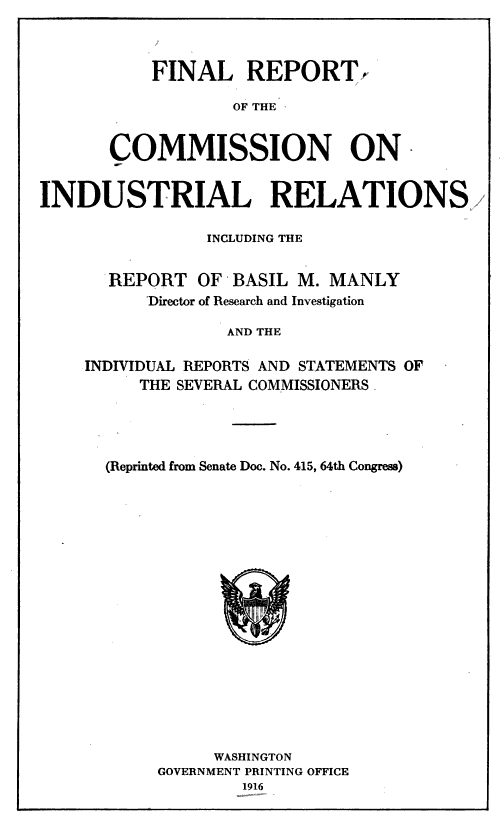
Final report of the Commission on Industrial Relations, 1916

The Commission on Industrial Relations (also known as the Walsh Commission) was a commission created by the U.S. Congress on August 23, 1912, to scrutinize US labor law. The commission studied work conditions throughout the industrial United States between 1913 and 1915. The final report of the Commission, published in eleven volumes in 1916, contain tens of thousands of pages of testimony from a wide range of witnesses, including Clarence Darrow, Louis Brandeis, Mary Harris "Mother" Jones, Theodore Schroeder, William "Big Bill" Haywood, scores of ordinary workers, and the titans of capitalism, including Daniel Guggenheim, George Walbridge Perkins Sr. (of U.S. Steel), Henry Ford, and Andrew Carnegie.

== Predecessors ==
In 1871, there was a failed attempt to create an Industrial Commission. There was also the Hewitt committee hearings of 1878–79, the three-year study of the Blair committee which ended in 1886, and a probe conducted from 1898 to 1902 by the United States Industrial Commission, appointed by President William McKinley.

== Origins ==
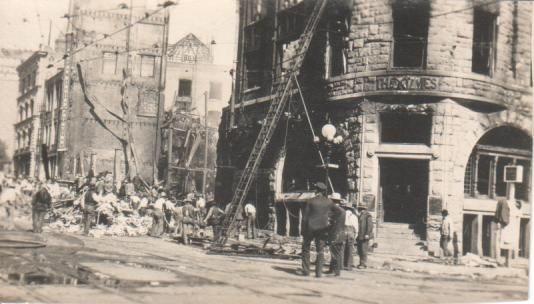
Rubble of the Times building after the bombing

In 1910, two leaders of the Structural Ironworkers Union, the McNamara Brothers, dynamited the Los Angeles Times building, killing twenty people. There was public outcry as a result, and President William Howard Taft proposed the creation of a nine-person investigative committee called the Commission on Industrial Relations, which was approved by Congress to be formally created April 23, 1912. Its findings were filed April 23, 1915.

The Commission on Industrial Relations got its name from a petition presented to President Taft on December 30, 1911, entitled "Petition to the President for a Federal Commission on Industrial Relations," signed by 28 prominent people, Members of the Committee on Standards of Living and Labor of the National Conference of Charities and Correction, many of whom were associated with Survey magazine, such as Paul Underwood Kellogg and John A. Fitch.

== Commission members ==
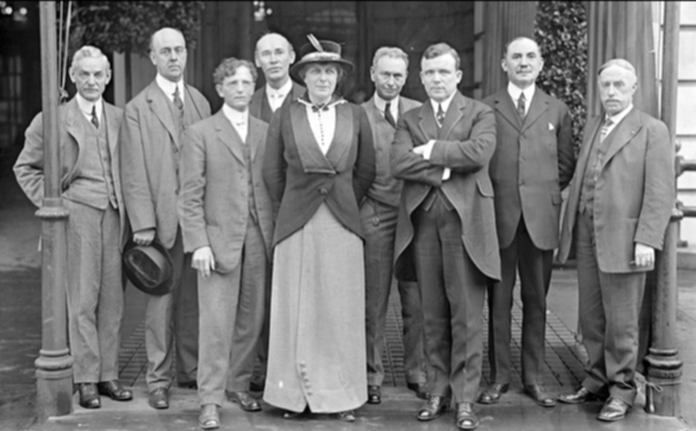
Original members of the Commission on Industrial Relations

The Commission was made up of nine commissioners, all nominated by the president and confirmed by the U.S. Senate. All but one served from beginning to end. The original nine Commissioners were:

- Chairman Frank P. Walsh, Kansas City, Missouri labor lawyer and activist (who once told a friend "I hate like hell to be respectable"),
- James O'Connell, of the American Federation of Labor (A.F.L.)
- Austin B. Garretson, of the Order of Railway Conductors
- John Brown Lennon, of the A.F.L.
- Frederic A. Delano, President of the Wabash Railroad (and uncle of Franklin Roosevelt)
- Florence Jaffray Harriman, a New York socialite and social activist
- Harris Weinstock, a progressive California businessman
- S. Thruston Ballard, a Kentucky democratic flour mill owner

Shortly before the Commission's final report, Commissioner Delano resigned, and was replaced by Richard Aishton, vice-president of the Chicago & Northwestern Railroad.

Among the Commission staff were John R. Commons, a labor economist at the University of Wisconsin–Madison, and Luke Grant, a labor journalist and editor of the Chicago Inter Ocean. Only one of Grant's reports on the structural ironworkers bombing campaign was actually published by the CIR. However, an explosive report by Grant "Violence in Labor Disputes and Methods of Policing Industry" was never published and is only available in draft form from the National Archives and Wisconsin Historical Society.

Congress had authorized the Commission shortly before the 1912 presidential election, in which incumbent President Taft was defeated by New Jersey Governor Woodrow Wilson. Four Commissioners ultimately confirmed were originally named by President Taft in December 1912, one month after his defeat: Commissioners Delano, O'Connell, Garretson and Lennon. Taft also nominated five other persons, but the Senate failed to confirm them. Those failed nominees were U.S. Senator George Sutherland of Utah (who was Taft's proposed chairman), Connecticut state legislator George B. Chandler (American Book Co.), Charles S. Barrett (Farmers' Union); Adolph Lewisohn (investment banker, copper magnate, and philanthropist); and F. C. Schwedtman (electrical engineer).

Two months after entering the White House, President Wilson nominated replacements for Taft's five failed nominees.

== Investigation ==
The Commission's responsibilities were to:

"inquire into the general condition of labor in the principal industries of the United States, including agriculture, and especially in those which are carried on in corporate forms ...; into the growth of associations of employers and of wage earners and the effect of such associations upon the relations between employers and employees ..."

The commission held 154 days of hearings. Walsh's leadership of the Commission attracted media attention and publicity. Some of the commission findings included:

1. The Commission found that lumber workers in the Northwest labored at their jobs for ten hours a day at only twenty cents an hour.
2. Seasonal unemployment affected tens of thousands of people in Pacific Coast cities. Only the fortunate averaged more than a meal a day.
3. In California, migrant laborers work in fields with temperatures up to 105 degrees on farms where growers refused to supply them water in the fields.
4. One Paterson, New Jersey, silk mill fined workers fifty cents for talking and fifty cents for laughing while at work.

"In an era of...muckraking, the [commission] raised the technique to an unprecedented height."

The commission studied several major strikes which occurred during its investigations, including:

1. The Paterson, New Jersey, silk mill strike (1911–1913), led by the Industrial Workers of the World,
2. New York City garment workers strike (1909–1910),
3. Illinois Central and Harriman lines struggles with the railroad shopmen (1911–1915),
4. The Colorado Fuel and Iron Company strike, where the Ludlow Massacre occurred (1913–1914).

When Walsh embarrassed President Wilson, and suggested investigating the southern states, U.S. Senator Hoke Smith of Georgia attempted to cut Walsh's budget 75 percent. The vote failed, and Walsh promptly sent investigators to Smith's state, making lasting and powerful enemies.

Journalist Walter Lippman stated there was "an atmosphere of no quarter" when Walsh subpoenaed and then questioned John D. Rockefeller Jr. about the Ludlow massacre. For three days Walsh publicly chastised Rockefeller.

Historian Montgomery stated that the commission found:

"repression by police, judicial, and military agencies, which envisaged themselves as the defenders of society's 'good people.' And in each case but Philadelphia, where the public as a whole was irate over the general conduct of the transit company, the 'good people' in turn endorsed the repression. Small wonder that in all these strikes, and above all in the sanguinary three-year conflict on the Illinois Central Railroad, workers simply took the law into their own hands."

== Commission conclusions ==
Unable to agree on many points, the Commission published three different final reports. One of the reports — primarily written by Commissioner Commons, with Commissioner Harriman — was signed by a bare majority of five Commissioners. Instead of calling for "industrial democracy," the Commons' report instead advocated the creation of impartial labor boards. It did not characterize conflict between labor and management as an inevitable and permanent condition. Commons' report expressed fear that the Commission's report would "throw the [labor] movement into politics."

Discussing the distribution of wealth in America, the Commission found that the poorer 65% of Americans together owned 8%, while the richest 2% owned 57% and concluded (vol. 1 p. 28): "The figures also show that with a reasonably equitable division of wealth, the entire population should occupy the position of comfort and security which we characterize as middle class. The actual concentration has, however, been carried very much further than these figures indicate. The largest private fortune in the United States, estimated at $1 billion [Rockefeller], is equivalent to the aggregate wealth of 2.5 million of those who are classed as 'poor,' who are shown in the studies cited to own on the average about $400 each." Concerning the concentration of economic control, the Commission concluded (vol. 1 p. 80): "The final control of American industry rests in the hands of a small number of wealthy and powerful financiers," fewer than 60 men altogether.

The report signed by chairman Walsh and commissioners Lennon, O'Connell and Garretson, written by attorney Basil Manly, was much more provocative and accusatory in its tone and conclusions. Its centerpiece was a call for industrial democracy and Henry George's 'Single Tax' on land values.

That report explained the conditions of agricultural estates:

"It is industrial feudalism in an extreme form. Such estates are, as a rule, the property of absentee landlords, who are for the most part millionaires, resident in the eastern States or in Europe."

Regarding conditions in company towns, the Manly report observed that they displayed "every aspect of feudalism except the recognition of special duties on the part of the employer."

A separate supplemental statement joined only by Commissioners Lennon and O'Connell opposed the creation of an agency-administered system of mediation and arbitration, in favor of strengthening trade unions (and employer associations). Their statement concluded:

"Where (labor) organization is lacking, dangerous discontent is found on every hand; low wages and long hours prevail; exploitation in every direction is practiced; the people become sullen, have no regard for law and government, and are, in reality, a latent volcano, as dangerous to society as are the volcanoes of nature to the landscape surrounding them."

"We hold that efforts to stay the organization of labor or to restrict the right of employees to organize should not be tolerated, but that the opposite policy should prevail, and the organization of the trade unions and of the employers' organizations should be promoted...This country is no longer a field for slavery, and where men and women are compelled, in order that they may live, to work under conditions in determining which they have no voice, they are not far removed from a condition existing under feudalism or slavery."

== Public response ==
The New Republic observed that the commission had gone well beyond its duties to investigate the "cause and cure" of labor unrest. In promoting industrial democracy, it offered a "tonic" for American democracy itself. The Seattle Union Record exclaimed that the report was "an indictment against organized capital. The journal The Masses stated the report signaled "the beginning of an indigenous American revolutionary movement.

Others criticized the report. The New York Herald characterized the Commission's president as "a Mother Jones in trousers." In 1916, Republican Presidential candidate Charles Evans Hughes called the commission "one of the tragic incidents of the present administration" which had "accomplished nothing." The president of the Pittsburgh Employers' Association stated publicly that Walsh "should be assassinated."

== Long-term influence ==
The influence the report had on US politics is debated among historians.

Graham Adams Jr. argues and Louis Galambos agrees that the Commission's hearings and reports influenced the passage of such labor legislation as the Adamson Eight-Hour Act. Historian Rayback explains that the commission's report influenced the decisions of the War Labor Board and the authors of New Deal labor legislation.

David Montgomery states:

"The uniqueness of the efforts of the Commission on Industrial Relations between 1913 and 1915 lay in its staff of Wisconsin-trained experts and in the steadfast refusal of its nine members to allow any diversion of their attention from immediate problems of industrial relations. These very qualities paradoxically imparted to the commission a political significance greater than that of all previous investigations combined, for out of its work emerged both a labor program for the Democratic party in 1916 which shattered the narrow limits of its 1912 platform and, through the minority report of John R. Commons and Mrs. J. Borden Harriman, a series of proposals that were to become widely infused into the welfare capitalism of the 1920s."

On the other hand, LaFayette Harter argues that the commission had been established to determine the roots of labor problems, but its liberal leanings caused Congress to ignore its findings.

George Brooks, reviewing Adams' book, contends that despite the fact that Frank P. Walsh later became cochairman, with William Howard Taft, of the War Labor Board during World War I that "it is an exaggeration to assume that the Commission was the principal, or even a major, cause of subsequent developments and to attribute to it, as [Adams] does, the development of "a more steeply graduated tax structure, promotion of collective bargaining, minimum wage scales, and the eight-hour day... ." There is nothing in [Adams book] which would support the view that the Commission ever had the importance of the La Follette or McClellan Committees."

== See also ==
- United States labor law
