= United Transportation Union =

North American trade union

- Abbreviation: UTU
- Merged into: International Association of Sheet Metal, Air, Rail and Transportation Workers
- Formation: 1969
- Dissolved: 2014
- Merger of: Brotherhood of Locomotive Firemen and Enginemen; Brotherhood of Railroad Trainmen; Order of Railway Conductors; Switchmen's Union of North America
- Type: Trade union
- Headquarters: Cleveland, Ohio, US
- Locations: Canada; United States
- Members: 65,593–84,679 (2000–2012)
- Affiliations: AFL-CIO; Canadian Labour Congress

The United Transportation Union (UTU) was a broad-based, transportation labor union that represented about 70,000 active and retired railroad, bus, mass transit, and airline workers in the United States. The UTU was headquartered in Cleveland, Ohio. On August 11, 2014, it merged with the Sheet Metal Workers' International Association (SMWIA) to form the International Association of Sheet Metal, Air, Rail and Transportation Workers, known by the acronym SMART.

== Membership ==
Membership (US records)
View source data.

Finances (US records; ×$1000)
View source data.

The UTU was the largest railroad operating union in North America, with more than 500 locals. The UTU represented employees on every Class I railroad in the United States, as well as employees on many American regional and shortline railroads. It also represented bus and mass transit employees on approximately 45 bus and transit systems and had grown to include airline pilots, flight attendants, dispatchers and other airport personnel. The UTU was very interested in the airline sector and hoped to expand its representation with pilots and flight attendants. The UTU believed it is a viable alternative to other aviation labor unions because the UTU operated under the belief that it has been proficient in interpreting and enforcing provisions of the Railroad Labor Act (RLA), under which airlines also operate.

Membership was drawn primarily from the operating crafts in the railroad industry and includes conductors, brakemen, switchmen, ground service personnel, locomotive engineers, hostlers and workers in associated crafts. More than 1,800 railroad yardmasters also are represented by the UTU. The UTU's 8,000 bus and transit members include drivers, mechanics and employees in related occupations.

== History ==
In 1968 exploratory talks among the four brotherhoods interested in forming one transportation union proved fruitful and plans were formulated for merging of the four operation unions into a single organization to represent all four operating crafts. The four unions were the Brotherhood of Locomotive Firemen and Enginemen, the Brotherhood of Railroad Trainmen, the Order of Railway Conductors and Brakemen, and the Switchmen's Union of North America. The first three of these were considered fraternal orders, as well as labor unions.

In August 1968, the union presidents announced that after nine months of planning, a tentative agreement had been reached on all phases of unity. It was further announced that the name of the new organization would be the United Transportation Union and the target date for establishing the UTU was January 1, 1969. In Chicago on December 10, 1968, the tabulation of the voting revealed an overwhelming desire by the members of the four crafts to merge into a single union, and the United Transportation Union came into existence on January 1, 1969.

The new union had 230,000 members. The first president was Charles Luna, formerly president of the Brotherhood of Railroad Trainmen. By 1978 the Union had 240,000 members in 1,000 branches. In 1970, the all-black International Association of Railway Employees joined the UTU. In 1971 the UTU Insurance Association assumed the insurance and welfare plans of the brotherhoods who had formed the UTU. The UTU held its first national convention in August 1971 in Miami Beach, Florida. Al Chesser, National Legislative Director of the UTU, was elected to succeed Luna, who was retiring.

In 1985, the Railroad Yardmasters of America joined.

== Presidents ==
1969: Charles Luna
1971: Al Chesser
1979: Fred Hardin
1991: G. Thomas DuBose
1995: Charlie Little
2001: Byron Boyd
2004: Paul Thompson
2008: Mike Futhey
