= Joshua A. Leach =

Joshua A. Leach, founder of the Brotherhood of Locomotive Firemen

Joshua A. Leach (May 8, 1843 – June 28, 1919) was an American locomotive worker and trade union functionary. He is best remembered as the founder of the Brotherhood of Locomotive Firemen (B of LF) in 1873 and head of that organization from 1873 to 1876.

Traveling to Terre Haute, Indiana, on behalf of the firemen's order in February 1875, Leach inspired the 19-year-old Eugene V. Debs to become active in the organization, leading to his election as Secretary-Treasurer in 1880 and starting him on a career as a trade union organizer.

== Biography ==
=== Early years ===
Joshua A. Leach was born in Nenagh, County Tipperary, Ireland, on May 8, 1843. He emigrated with his parents to the United States when he was a three-month-old infant, with the family settling in Port Jervis, New York. He grew up in that small town in southern New York state.

In 1861, Leach volunteered to fight for the Union cause during the American Civil War as a member of the 56th New York Volunteer Infantry. He was married to the former Sarah A. Tuthill in 1864 when at home on furlough from the war.

The 56th New York Infantry would muster out on October 17, 1865, at Charleston, South Carolina.

=== Founding the Brotherhood of Locomotive Firemen ===
Josh Leach as a young man

In 1869 Leach took a job as a locomotive fireman for the Erie Railroad. The job was perilous with insurance against death or dismemberment frequently difficult or impossible to obtain for poorly paid railway workers, and Leach began to think about the establishment of a fraternal benefit society for the firemen patterned on the already established Brotherhood of Locomotive Engineers (B of LE).

In December 1873, Leach got together with 11 other employees of the Erie Railroad to establish a new fraternal-benefit society, which they named the Brotherhood of Locomotive Firemen (B of LF). The group established Lodge No. 1 of the new order, nicknamed Deer Park. Leach would be elected the organization's first chief executive officer of the B of LF, remaining in that capacity until 1876.

Leach traveled extensively on behalf of the new brotherhood, helping to launch many of the fledgling order's first lodges. In the evening of February 27, 1875, Leach held an organizing meeting in Terre Haute, Indiana, where he made the acquaintance of a young grocery warehouseman who had until recently worked as a locomotive fireman. The 19-year-old, Eugene V. Debs, was inspired by Leach's presentation and became the secretary of B of LF Lodge No. 16, Vigo Lodge. Debs would go on to become associate editor of the B of LF's monthly magazine in 1878, and editor and secretary-treasurer of the organization in 1880.

In October 1877, Leach relocated from Port Jervis to Nebraska City, Nebraska, where he lived on a farm. Leach went to work for the Missouri Pacific Railroad, soon gaining promotion from fireman to the better paid and more responsible position of engineer.

=== Later years ===
By the first decade of the 20th century, Leach had gained sufficient gravitas to earn the popular nickname "Dad" among locomotive enginemen. He was hired by the International Correspondence School for a position and worked briefly as a traveling instructor aboard an educational railway car. Leach and four others traveled railroads throughout the west, providing on site instruction to railroad workers on the use of airbrakes, the technical aspects of locomotive engines, and what to do in case of emergencies.

During his later years Leach continued to work as a locomotive engineer for the Missouri Pacific Railroad. The Brotherhood of Locomotive Firemen & Engineers which he founded made a gift to him of a home in Sedalia, Missouri, to which he retired sometime during the middle-1910s.

=== Death and legacy ===
Visiting Denver, Colorado, to attend the triennial convention of the Brotherhood of Locomotive Firemen & Enginemen in June 1919, Leach was stricken with a bout of pleurisy and chest pain. He was able to attend only the first day of the convention before being incapacitated by illness. He would never leave the city of Denver alive.

At 8:15 pm on June 28 Leach suffered a massive heart attack, which proved fatal. He was 76 years old at the time of his death.

Leach's body was subsequently transported for burial to his hometown of Sedalia, Missouri.
