= Order of Railway Conductors =

Order of Railway Conductors of America
- Merged: United Transportation Union
- Founded: December 15, 1868
- Dissolved: January 1, 1969
- Headquarters: Cedar Rapids, Iowa
- Location(s): United States and Canada

The Order of Railway Conductors of America (ORC) was a labor union that represented train conductors in the United States. It has its origins in the Conductors Union founded in 1868. Later it extended membership to brakemen. In 1969 the ORC merged with three other unions to form the United Transportation Union.

== Organizational history ==
=== Foundation (1868) ===
The first Conductor's Union was formed in early 1868 at Amboy, Illinois, by a group of conductors on the Illinois Central Railroad. Soon after another division was formed at Galesburg, Illinois, by a group of conductors from the Chicago, Burlington and Quincy Railroad. The two groups met in July 1868 at Mendota, Illinois, and formed the "Conductors Union", which was to organize conductors across the country. On December 15, 1868 the group met at Columbus, Ohio, where they elected the leaders to form a "grand division" and adopted a constitution and bylaws.

The ORC represented the interests of train conductors, whose job function approximated that of an ocean ship captain and were consequently the most prestigious and highly compensated railway workers of their era. The ORC was governed by conventions held every three years and was not part of the American Federation of Labor.

=== Benefit and temperance society (1869-1890) ===
Cover of the January 1885 issue of Railway Conductor's Monthly.

The original organization was a fraternal benefit and temperance society rather than a labor union. It adopted the name "Conductors Brotherhood" at its first annual convention in 1869, and changed to the "Order of Railway Conductors of America" in 1878.

The order began to publish its official organ, the monthly magazine Railway Conductor's Monthly, in 1884. The publication was renamed The Railway Conductor and moved to a semi-monthly frequency in August 1889. The magazine's frequency reverted to monthly status in June 1891.

The order was incorporated in 1887 and made its headquarters in Cedar Rapids, Iowa. The objectives given in the 1887 articles of incorporation were, "To unite its members; to combine their interests as railway conductors; to elevate their standards as such and their character as men for their mutual improvement and advantage, socially and otherwise..." The order provided mutual support and assistance to conductors, and administered a death and disability insurance plan. It covered the territories of the United States and Canada. Membership was open to white men in the occupations of road conductors, assistant conductors and ticket collectors; road brakemen, flagmen and train baggagemen; yard conductors, yard foremen and other yard trades.

From 1877 to 1890 any member that participated in a strike would be expelled from the order. This led to the perception among other railway labor organizations that the conductors were strikebreakers. In response, the rival Brotherhood of Railway Conductors was formed as a labor union in 1885. A later report of this event in the journal of the Brotherhood of Railroad Trainmen said "the Brotherhood of Railway Conductors was organized at a time when the Order of Railway Conductors could scarcely be said to be in good standing with the laboring people because it had not a protective constitution. The young Brotherhood was organized to supply a pressing want of the time..." During a strike of switchmen in Chicago in 1886, the Rock Island Division 106 of the Order of Railway Conductors said the demands of the switchmen were unjust and unreasonable. In response, one of the lodges of the Switchmen's Mutual Aid Association resolved, "That we extend our contempt and detestation to the members of Division 106, Order of Railway Conductors, for grovelling at the feet of railroad officials..."

=== Consolidation (1890-1941) ===
This ORC membership card for 1912 features a perforated serial number reminiscent of the train tickets punched by conductors.

Internal and external pressures combined to cause an upheaval in the organization in 1890. The old leaders were dismissed and a new, more aggressive policy of trade regulation was adopted. Good relations were established with other unions. The order continued to provide strong fraternal and beneficial services, but the focus shifted to regulating working conditions and negotiating trade agreements to resolve difficulties with railroad owners. At the September 21, 1891 meeting of the Brotherhood of Railway Conductors its Grand Chief George W. Howard recommended consolidation with the Order of Railway conductors. The rival Brotherhood was absorbed into the order.

In 1888 Edgar E. Clark had been elected Grand Senior Conductor of the order. In 1890 he became Grand Chief Conductor of the Order. Clark would head the union until 1906. Assisting him, in 1894 Austin B. Garretson was elected grand senior conductor, while C. H. Wilkins was assistant grand chief conductor. Garretson and Wilkins then exchanged positions. In 1900 E. E. Clark made a speech at the Chicago Conference on Conciliation where he said that the men favored arbitration for settlement of labor disputes.

On 1 September 1906 Austin B. Garretson was elected Grand Chief Conductor of the Order. His title was changed to president in 1907. In 1907 the ORC and other railroad unions managed to get Congress to pass laws that limited to sixteen the maximum number of hours a railroader could work in one day. Garretson was appointed a member of the Commission on Industrial Relations created by the United States Congress on 23 August 1912. The commission sat through 154 days of public hearings between the fall of 1913 and the spring of 1915, uncovering many abuses and making various recommendations. In the late summer of 1916 Garretson played a leading role in negotiations in which railway workers won the right to an eight-hour day and time and a half overtime pay with the passage of the Adamson Act. Garretson retired in 1919.

Lucius E. Sheppard (1863-1934) was president of the Order of Railway Conductors from 1919-28. He was one of the committee of six leaders of the main railway unions who founded the Conference for Progressive Political Action in Chicago in February 1922.

The order's president S. N. Berry died on June 27, 1934. On 16 July 1934 James A. Phillips was appointed to fill his unexpired term as president. Phillips was elected chairman of the Railway Labor Executives' Association in February 1940. He replaced George Harrison, who resigned. Phillips became President-Emeritus of the Order of Railway Conductors in 1941.

=== Later history (1941-1969) ===
Harry W. Fraser was president of the Order of Railway Conductors of America from 1941 to 1950. During World War II he was a representative of labor interests of the government's Management-Labor Policy Committee. Fraser encouraged the Order of Sleeping Car Conductors to join the Order of Railway Conductors during the war. The Order of Sleeping Car Conductors amalgamated with the ORC in 1942. Fraser was twice president of the Railway Labor Executives' Association. Fraser died of a series of heart attacks at the union convention in May 1950. Roy O. Hughes of Milwaukee was elected as his successor.

During the period from 1951 to 1954 various agreements were made over wage increases, cost of living adjustments and rules changes. The order had been accepting brakemen as members since the 1930s, and in 1954 the union changed its name to the Order of Railway Conductors and Brakemen (ORC&B). On May 26, 1955, after mediation, a strike ballot and Presidential Emergency Board 109, the order achieved agreement on a graduated rate of pay system. Further gains were made in 1964, when employees won paid holidays and expenses away from home, and in 1966 when further improvements to wages and benefits were gained.

In 1969 the ORC&B merged with the Brotherhood of Locomotive Firemen and Enginemen, the Brotherhood of Railroad Trainmen, and the Switchmen's Union of North America to form the "United Transportation Union" (UTU).

== See also ==
- History of rail transport in the United States
- List of American railway unions
