= Brotherhood of Railroad Trainmen =

Former railroad union in the USA

- Merged into: United Transportation Union
- Founded: June 1883
- Dissolved: 1 January 1969
- Headquarters: Cleveland, Ohio
- Location: International

The Brotherhood of Railroad Trainmen (BRT) was a labor organization for railroad employees founded in 1883. Originally called the Brotherhood of Railroad Brakemen, its purpose was to negotiate contracts with railroad management and to provide insurance for members.

The BRT grew to become the largest brotherhood of operating railroad employees. In 1969, it merged with three other unions to form the United Transportation Union.

== Organization and membership ==
The Brotherhood was organized into lodges. Its executive was elected every four years at the Grand Lodge Convention, including the president. There were four governing boards: the Board of Directors, Board of Trustees and Insurance, Board of Appeals, and Executive Board. Members in rail service included conductors and their assistants, dining car stewards, ticket collectors, train baggagemen, brakemen, and train flagmen. Member in yard service included yardmasters, yard conductors, switchtenders, foremen, flagmen, brakemen, switchmen, car tenders, operators, hump riders, and car operators.

Brotherhood of Railroad Trainmen lapel pins worn by members
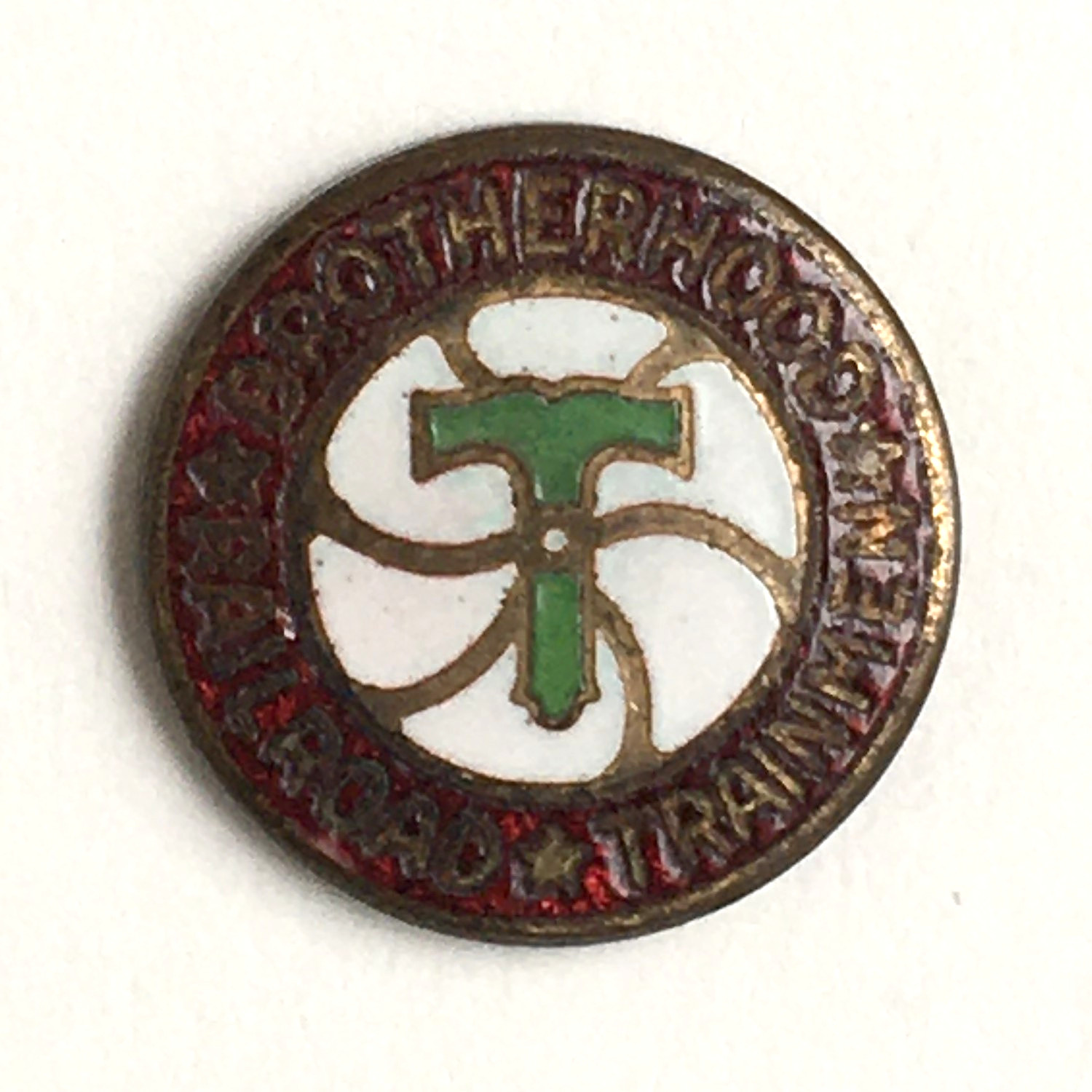
Member pin

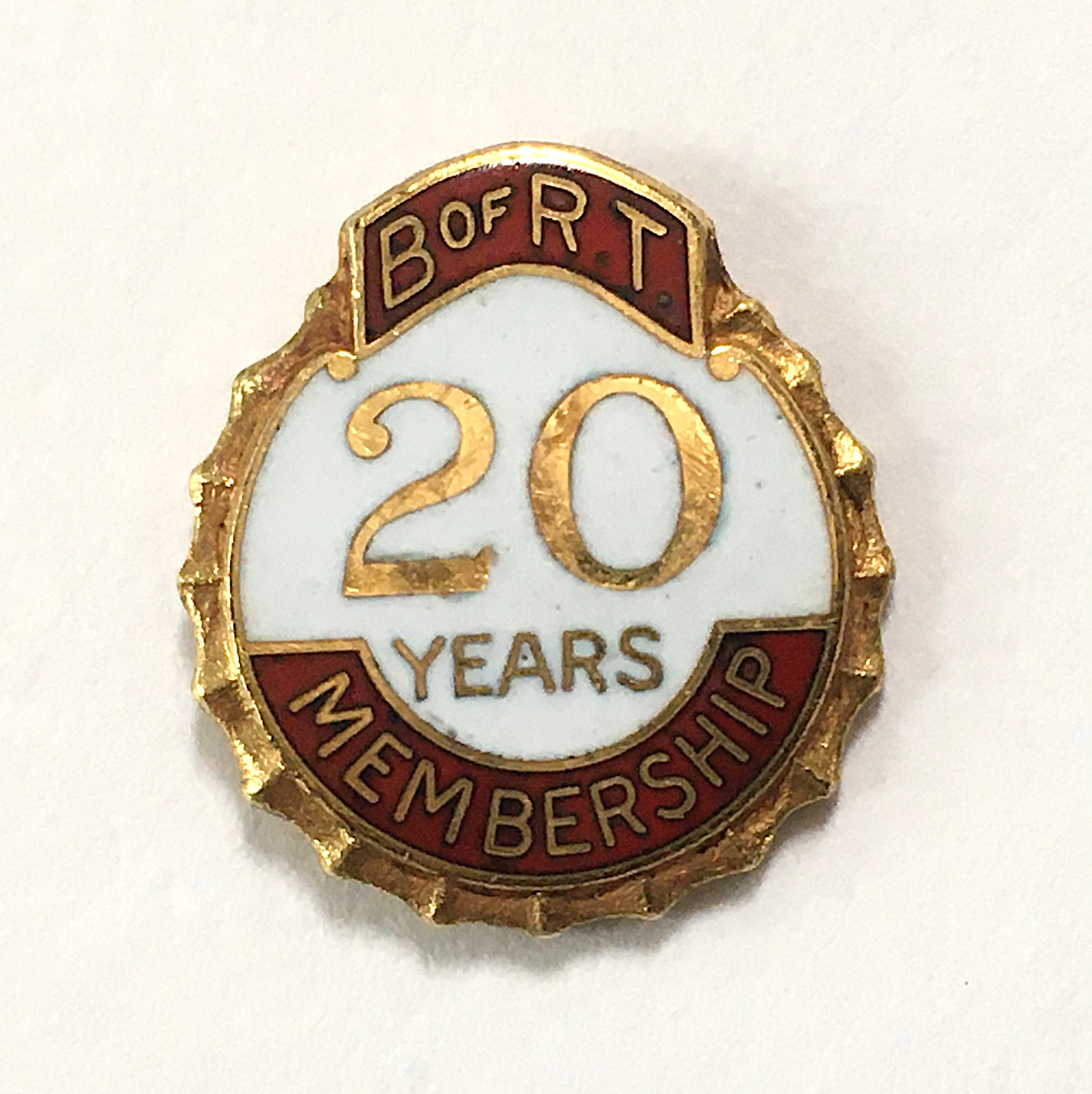
20 years member pin

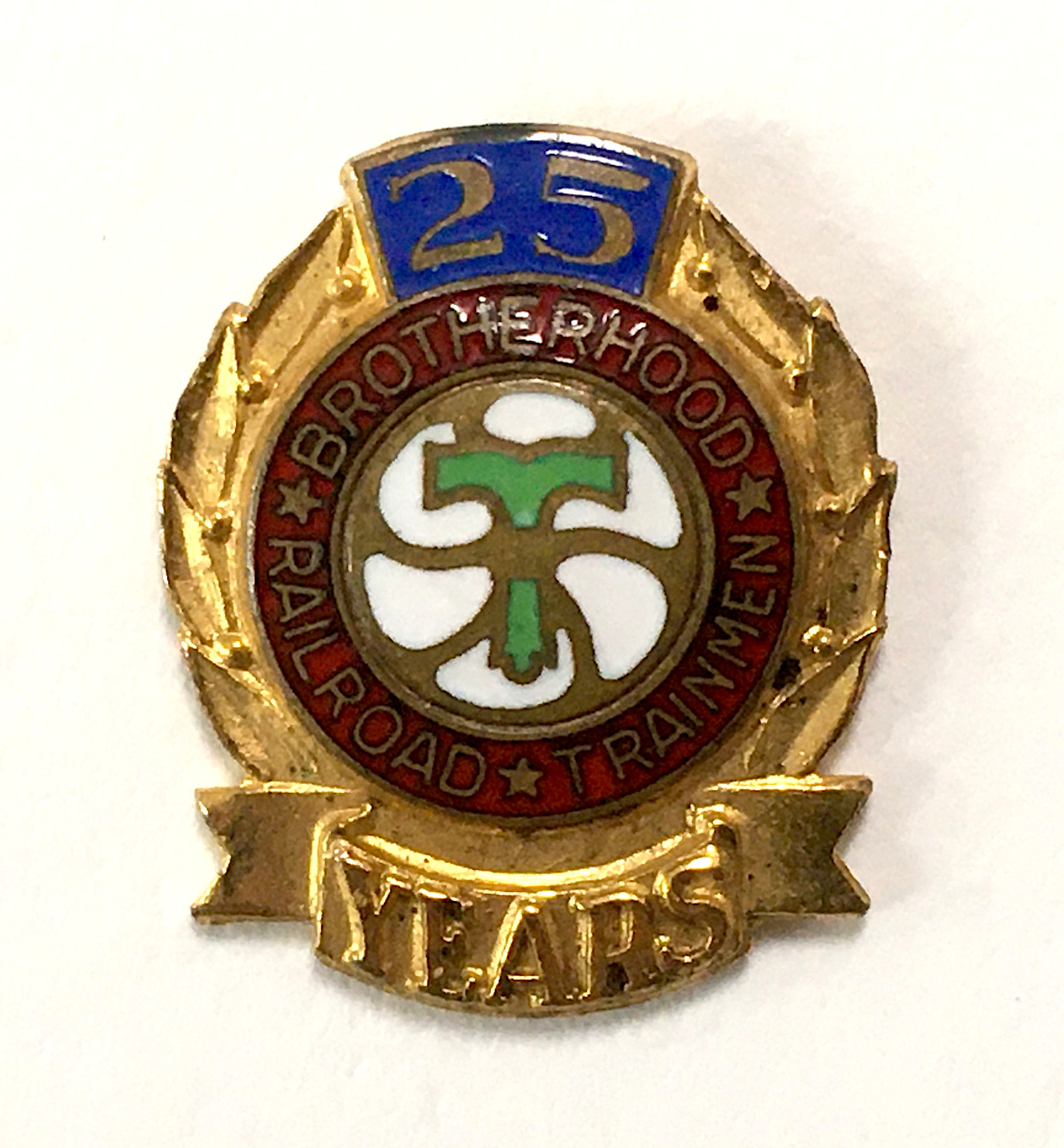
25 years member pin

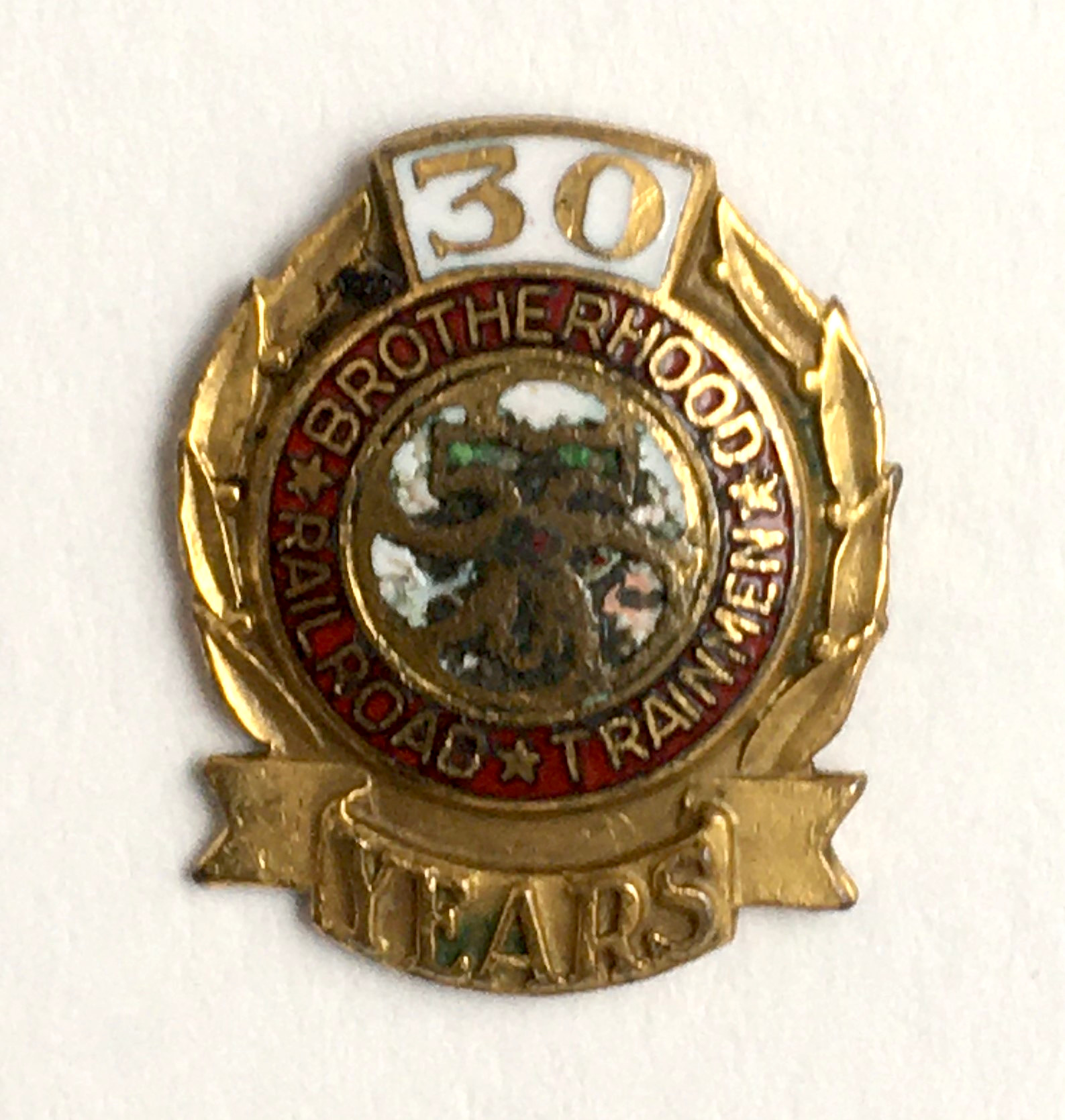
30 years member pin

== History ==
=== Early years (1883–1889) ===
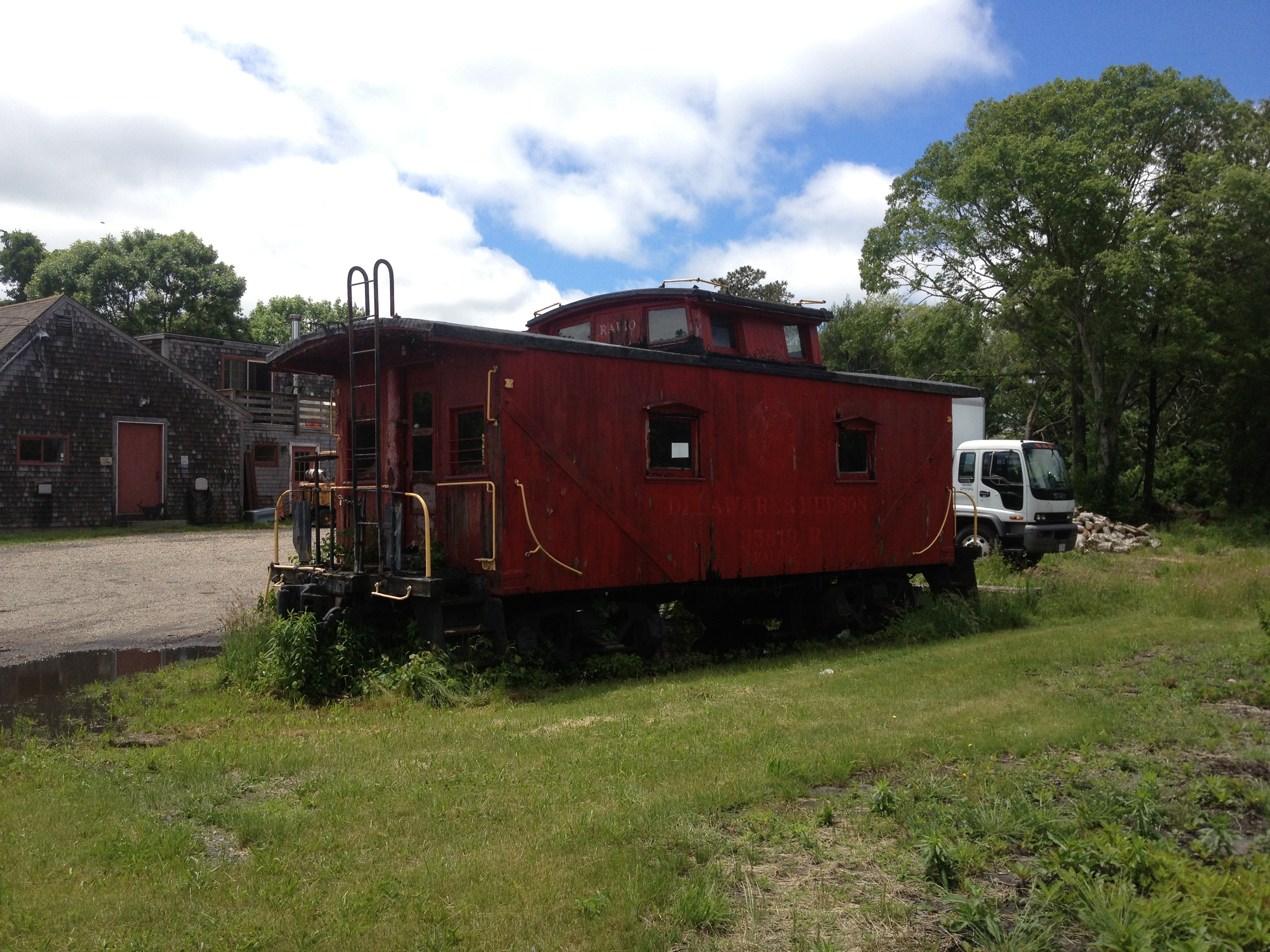
An old caboose of the Delaware and Hudson Railway

The Brotherhood was founded on 23 September 1883 in Oneonta, New York by eight brakemen in Delaware and Hudson Railway Caboose No. 10. The original name was the Brotherhood of Railroad Brakemen. At the time, wages were just over $1 a day. The work was dangerous, with 33% of brakemen being injured in the year of foundation. The Brotherhood offered death coverage of up to $300, and was the only way members could obtain insurance. The Brotherhood's insurance department was established in 1885 and maximum death benefits raised to $600. The union restricted membership to whites.

In 1885 the first Canadian lodge was established in Moncton, New Brunswick. That year Stephen E. Wilkinson (1850-1901) became the first Grand Master of the Brotherhood, which now had 4,500 members. By 1886 there were 8,000 members in 244 local lodges. Maximum death benefits were raised again, to $800. By 1898 the railways employed over 800,000 workers, 5% of the total labor force in the United States. Brotherhoods organized by craft represented Locomotive Engineers, Conductors, Firemen, Trackmen, Switchmen, Carmen and Telegraphers. The brotherhoods provided social and educational benefits, insurance and relief, and helped resolve disputes between members and employees. Generally, they were very cautious about resorting to strikes. An 1887 publication by the BRT laid out its goals:

Railway managers and superintendents recognize in the Brotherhood a school for the mental, moral and physical improvement of its members, and consequently a better and more desirable class of men, who can be depended upon at all times, and into whose care and watchfulness thousands of lives and millions of dollars worth of property can be safely entrusted.

=== Expansion (1889–1945) ===
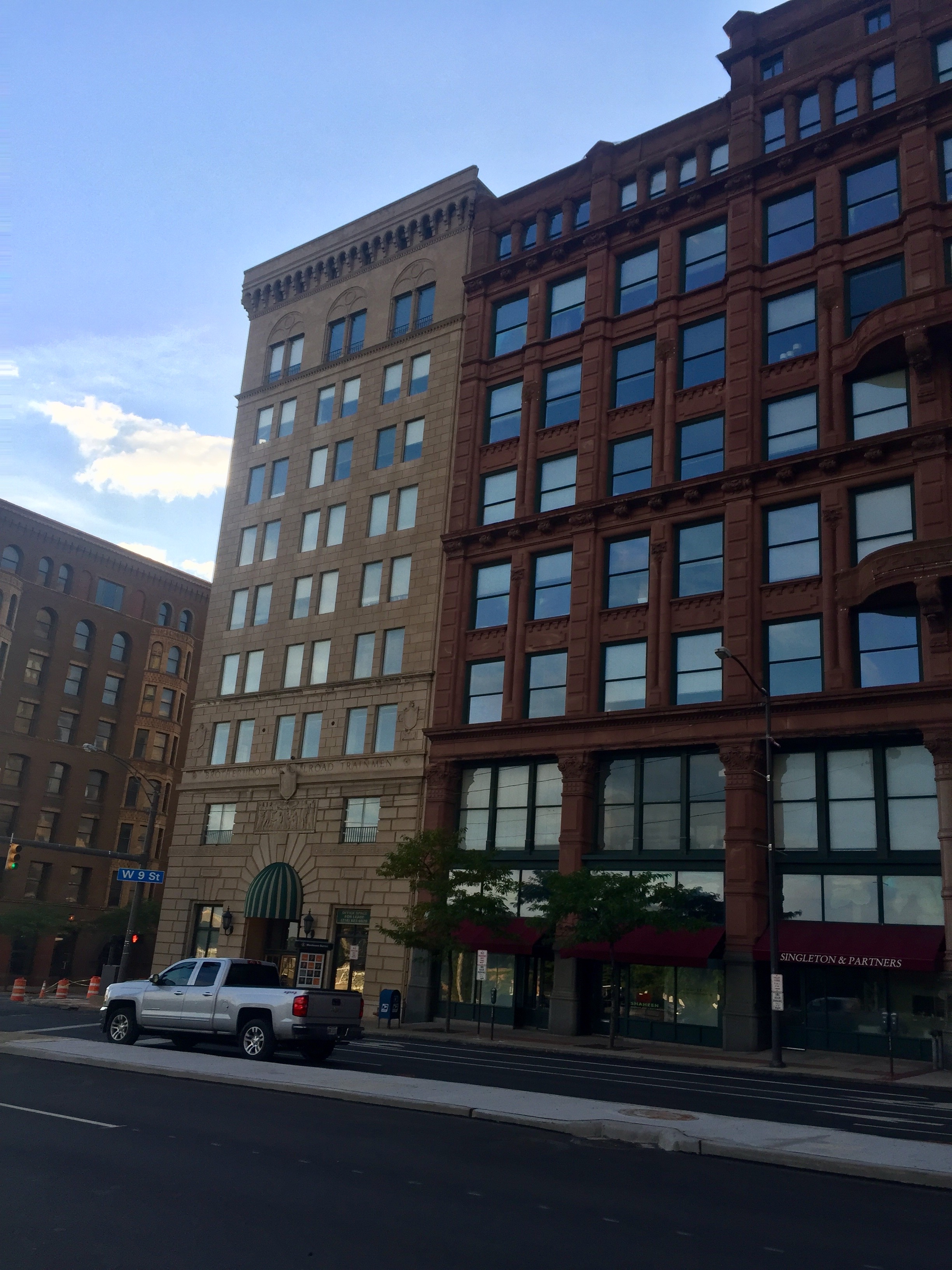
Brotherhood of Railroad Trainmen Building, Cleveland

The year 1889 was one of growth. The first Ladies' Auxiliary was organized in Fort Gratiot, Michigan. The Brotherhood changed its name to the Brotherhood of Railroad Trainmen, and expanded its membership to over fourteen trade classifications. Working with the Brotherhood of Locomotive Firemen, the BRT engaged Lorenzo S. Coffin, formerly a railroad commissioner of Iowa, to present its case for better working conditions in Washington. There was an economic downturn in the 1890s, causing many members of the BRT to lose their jobs. The problems were compounded by the 1894 Pullman Strike, when the Brotherhood expelled members for supporting the strikers. In all, the BRT lost 9,000 members. By the time of the 1895 convention there were less than 10,000 members remaining and the union had debts of $105,000. At the May 1895 BRT convention in Galesburg, Illinois, Wilkinson offered his resignation and it was accepted.

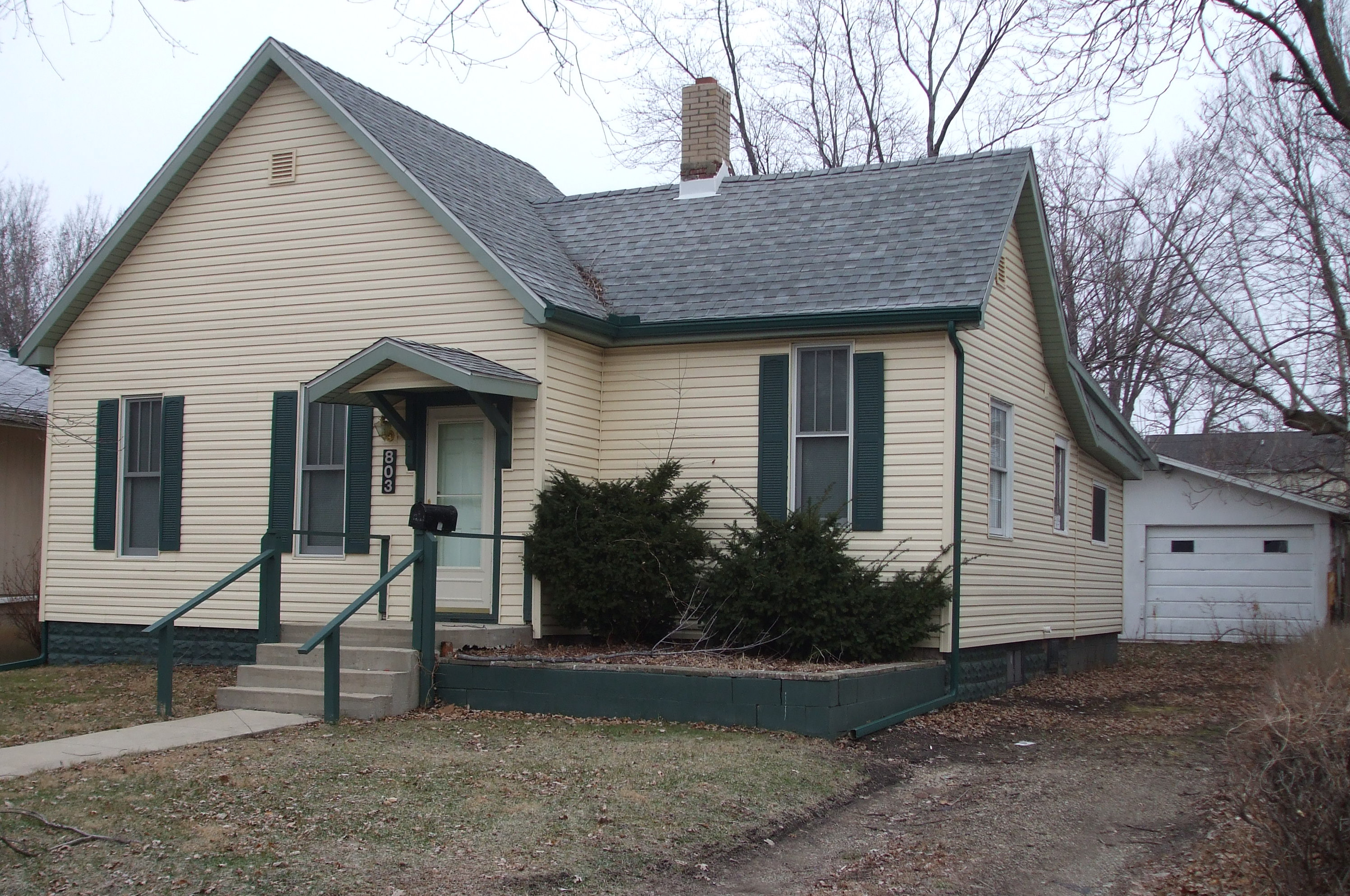
Childhood home of Patrick Morrissey, Brotherhood of Railroad Trainmen leader in Bloomington, Illinois

Patrick H. Morrissey (1862–1916) had been Vice-Grand Master of the BRT from 1889, helping establish new lodges across the country. He was elected to replace Wilkinson as Grandmaster and headed the Brotherhood from 1895 to 1909. Morrissey worked with the Order of Railway Conductors in 1902 to negotiate with the western railroads, where the two unions won contracts they used as a model elsewhere. By acting on a regional basis rather than dealing with each company separately, the BRT prevented the railroad companies from exploiting differences between workers on different lines. In 1902 Morrissey provided support when Samuel Gompers of the American Federation of Labor called for help for striking coal miners in West Virginia. By the end of his tenure the Brotherhood had 120,000 members, $2 million in insurance funds and had a strike fund of $1.5 million.

In January 1909 William Granville Lee was elected grand-master of the BRT, and relocated to the Brotherhood's headquarters in Cleveland, Ohio. During the eastern railroad strike of 1913, Erie Railroad employees demanded a 20% increase in wages. Erie management had refused a wage increase but compromised by asking employees to wait until January 1915 for any advance. W.G. Lee said that the only way "to deal with the Erie is through J.P. Morgan & Company, or the banks". However, he and other Union leaders agreed to stay out of the dispute. In 1913 and 1914 Lee led successful strikes against the Southern Pacific Railroad, Delaware and Hudson Railway, and the Belt Railway of Chicago.

Lee worked with the other railway brotherhoods for legislation to limit working hours on interstate railroads to eight-hour days, resulting in the 1916 Adamson Act. The railroads were seized by the Federal government during World War I (1914-1918). Labor made significant gains in contract conditions during the period of government control. Lee did not want to jeopardize these gains. During negotiations in 1919-20 on returning the lines to private ownership he helped to break a wildcat strike by the Switchmen's Union of North America. In 1921 the Railway Labor Board made a wage decision that fell short of union expectations, but Lee helped persuade the railway brotherhoods to accept the decision. The classical Brotherhood of Railroad Trainmen Building in Cleveland was built in 1921, designed by Charles Sumner Schneider. Lee stepped down as president of the Brotherhood of Railroad Trainmen in 1928.

Alexander F. Whitney was elected president of the Brotherhood on 1 July 1928. Whitney soon became an important public figure, representing the trainmen in many discussions with government and business. During his tenure the Brotherhood of Railway Trainmen grew to 215,000 members. After Franklin D. Roosevelt took office in 1933, the president appointed a committee to draw up new legislation for the railroads. Their draft included various measures to improve efficiency. On 3 April 1933 Whitney said the plan could throw from 50,000 to 350,000 men out of work, and would violate contracts related to security of employment. He called for guarantees that the government would ensure absorptive employment, consult with the unions on any changes and prevent carriers from interfering with labor's right to organize. The Emergency Railroad Transportation Act of 16 June 1933 essentially met these conditions, and was seen by the union leaders as a great victory.

In 1933 the Brotherhood organized employees of interstate bus operators for the first time. In New York, the City Board of Transportation ran the Independent Subway System (IND). In 1937 Mayor Fiorello La Guardia invited the Brotherhood of Railroad Trainmen to represent the motormen, but had to retreat when Roy Wilkins of the NAACP pointed out that this brotherhood did not allow African-American workers to join, while the Transport Workers Union of America (TWU) did.

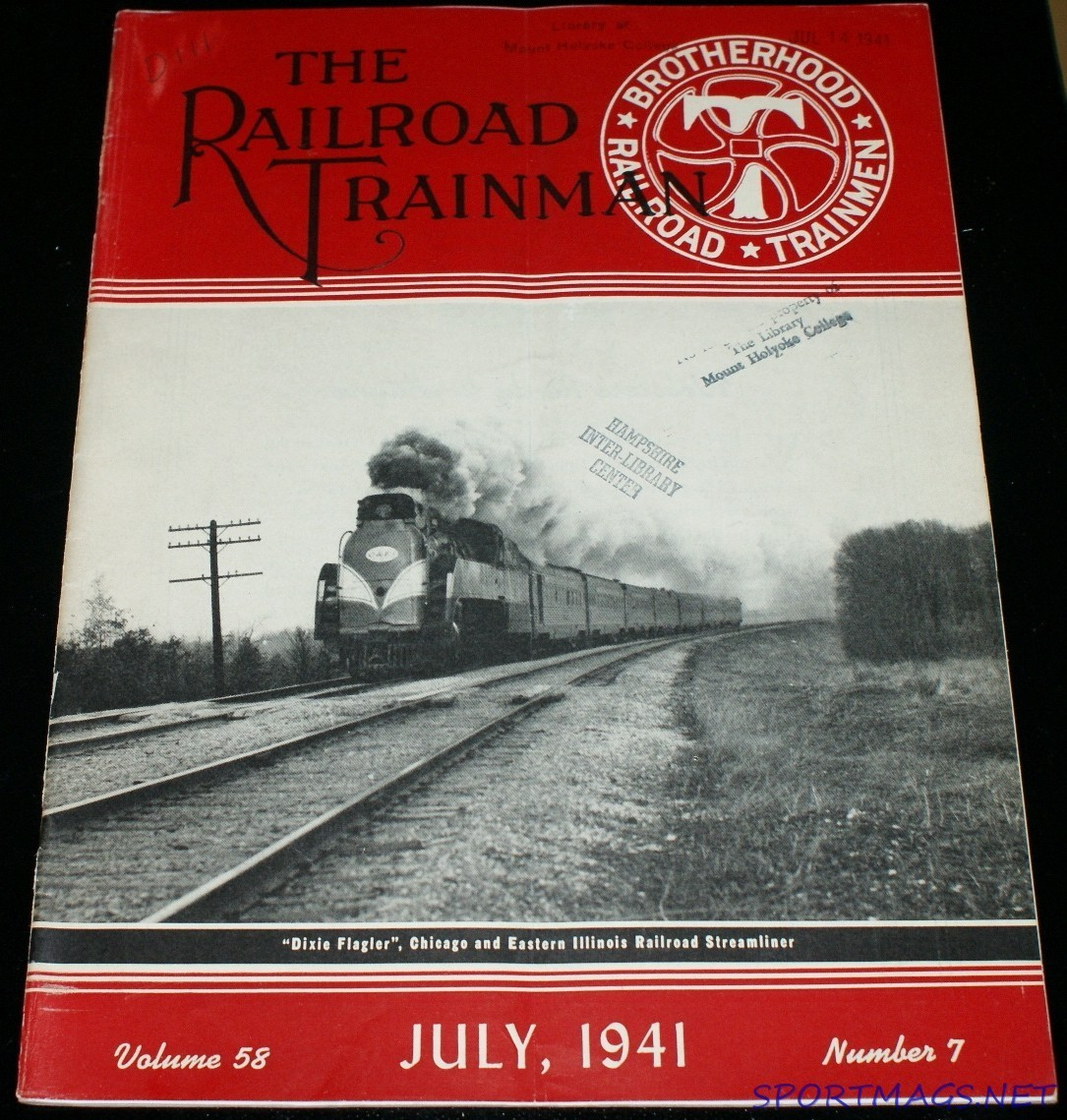
Cover of The Railroad Trainman July 1941 showing the Dixie Flagler

=== 1945-46 Strike ===
After World War II (1939-1945) ended, towards the end of 1945 Whitney and the leaders of the other main railroad unions demanded pay increases and a forty-hour work week from the railroad companies, in line with other industries. Negotiations stalled in January 1946. Three of the unions were willing to suspend their demands, but Whitney and Alvanley Johnston, leader of the Brotherhood of Locomotive Engineers, called a strike of their members to start on 16 March 1946. President Truman set up a board to hear the grievances and make recommendations. Negotiations broke down in April, and Whitney and Johnston set 18 May 1946 as the strike date. The BRT represented 211,000 trainmen and Johnston represented 78,000 engineers. They could halt all railway traffic nationwide.

The day before the walkout was due Truman seized the railroads by executive order. Whitney and Johnston again agreed to postpone the strike for five days. However, after hearing Truman's compromise pay offer their members voted to go on strike on 23 May 1946. The strike stranded travelers, prevented movement of perishable goods and caused concern that many people in war-devastated Europe would starve if grain shipments were delayed. Truman broadcast an appeal to the strikers to return to work, saying "It is inconceivable that in our democracy any two men should be placed in a position where they can completely stifle our economy and ultimately destroy our country." He threatened to call out the army to end the strike. On 25 May Truman was addressing Congress, calling for drastic legislation under which strikers could be drafted into the army, when word came that the strikers had accepted his terms and the strike had ended.

=== Later history ===
Alexander F. Whitney died of a heart attack on 16 July 1949 at the age of 76. William Parker Kennedy was president from 1949 to 1963. On 25 August 1950 President Truman issued an order for the federal government to take control of the 131 major railroads in the United States. The order came three days before the members of the BRT and the Order of Railway Conductors, were scheduled to halt work. Truman had just ordered U.S. troops to intervene in the Korean War, and could not afford to have the railways paralyzed. The strike continued until May 1952, when the Brotherhood of Railroad Trainmen, the Order of Railway Conductors and the Brotherhood of Locomotive Firemen and Enginemen accepted the government's terms and returned to work.

In the late 1950s, the union's Department of Legal Counsel (connecting injured members to prescreened attorneys) ran afoul of the Virginia State Bar. However, the union appealed to the United States Supreme Court, which in 1964 found the prosecution violated the railroad workers' first amendment right to associate, citing NAACP v. Button and Gideon v. Wainwright.

The Brotherhood reached its greatest size in 1956, with 217,176 members, after which railroad traffic and employment began to decline. In 1957 the BRT affiliated with the AFL-CIO and the Canadian Labour Congress. Charles Luna became president in 1963. On 1 January 1969 the BRT merged with three other unions to form the United Transportation Union. The others were the Brotherhood of Locomotive Firemen and Enginemen, the Order of Railway Conductors and Brakemen and the Switchmen’s Union of North America. Charles Luna became president of the combined union.
