= Brotherhood of Locomotive Firemen and Enginemen =

American labor organization

Logo of the Brotherhood of Locomotive Firemen established in 1873, but from 1907 known as the Brotherhood of Locomotive Firemen and Enginemen

The Brotherhood of Locomotive Firemen and Enginemen (B of LF&E) was a North American railroad fraternal benefit society and trade union in the 19th and 20th centuries. The organization began in 1873 as the Brotherhood of Locomotive Firemen (B of LF), a mutual benefit society for workers employed as firemen for steam locomotives, before expanding its name in 1907 in acknowledgement that many of its members had been promoted to the job of railroad engineer. Gradually taking on the functions of a trade union over time, in 1969 the B of LF&E merged with three other railway labor organizations to form the United Transportation Union.

== Organizational history ==
=== Background ===
Joshua A. Leach, founder of the B of LF and Grand Master of the organization from 1873 to 1876

Early railway transportation relied upon steam engines to power railway locomotives—large coal-fired boilers which generated motive power through the manipulation of concentrated steam. These boilers required a regular input of fuel to keep the train fired up and running. It was the task of so-called locomotive firemen to shovel coal into a train engine's firebox through a narrow opening, thereby feeding the fire.

The job of a locomotive fireman was physically demanding and potentially dangerous. Although by no means a highly skilled task, locomotive firemen nevertheless needed to develop not only physical strength, moving heavy coal on a swaying platform, but also a practical knowledge , estimating the engine's burn rate and future fuel needs, making sure that water was continuously in the boiler to avoid an explosion and ensuring that coal was sufficiently and properly spread in the firebox to ensure the locomotive's efficient operation.

A locomotive's fireman worked in a tandem with the train's engineer, serving in a subordinate role as his assistant. Firemen were in practice often engineers-in-training, learning the skills of train operation and assisting the engineer with the observation of signals and other routine aspects of his job performance, waiting for a job opportunity for promotion.

Locomotive firemen were consequently lower paid and of lower status than the highly paid railroad engineers—although both of these were actually subordinate to the train's conductor. It was the conductor, not the locomotive engineer, who was most comparable to the captain of a ship. The conductor oversaw the crew and assigned them their mission, made sure the train ran on schedule, inspected car couplings, arranged for the train to maintain adequate supplies, collected passenger fares and supervised the train's freight documentation. Conductors acted as both supervisors and traveling clerks and were in practice the figures of the highest authority on a train. Locomotive fireman generally received but half the salary of a conductor or engineer and shared in none of their authority.

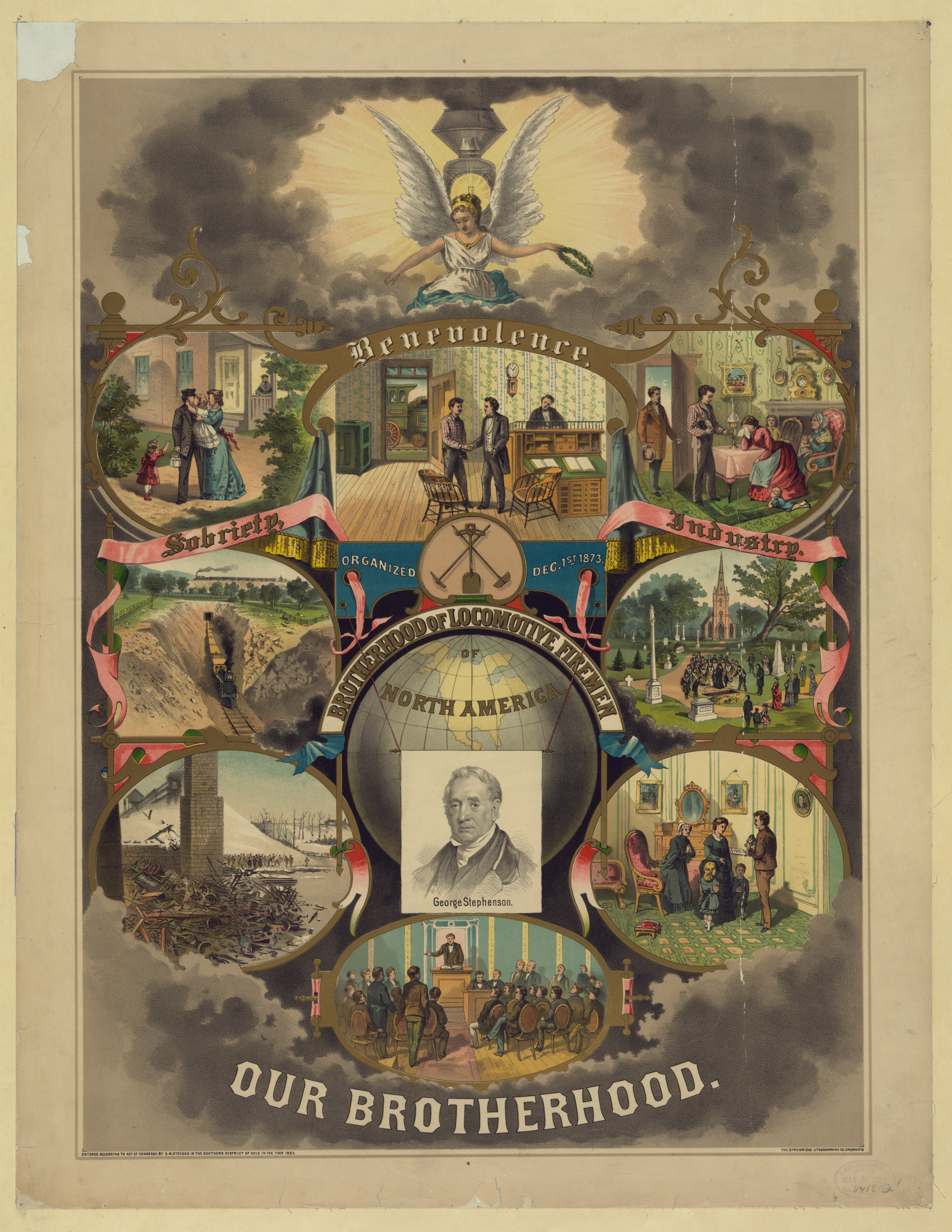
Poster from 1873

Despite the hard nature of the work process, their low professional status and their mediocre pay, locomotive firemen performed very dangerous jobs. Boiler explosions and other railway accidents made railroad work among the most deadly in the United States at the end of the 19th century, with an annual fatality rate in the early 1890s of approximately 9 per 1,000 workers—higher even than the 7.8 per 1,000 fatality rate suffered by hard rock miners in the Western United States. Non-fatal workplace accidents were also endemic among railroad workers, with one study by the Illinois Bureau of Labor Statistics determining that railroad workers suffered more than half the broken arms and ribs and 71 percent of all arms and legs amputated as the result of mishaps on the job.

During the 19th century, occupational safety regulation was non-existent in the United States as were the social benefits of the welfare state for employees injured on the job or the families of workers who suffered fatal accidents. As a result, workers themselves endeavored to form fraternal organizations among their peers for the purposes of insurance and the payment of benefits for death or disability suffered on the job. Some of these organizations were based upon religion or ethnicity, while others were occupational in nature. The Brotherhood of Locomotive Firemen—later known as the Brotherhood of Locomotive Firemen and Enginemen—was one such organization.

=== Establishment ===
An early membership transfer card of the Brotherhood of Locomotive Firemen (Central Lodge, Urbana, IL, 1878)

It was the engineers who pioneered occupational fraternal benefit organization in the railroad industry, with the Brotherhood of Locomotive Engineers launching a charity called the Widows', Orphans', and Disabled Members' Fund in 1866. That organization went on to expand its benefits package through the establishment of a formal life insurance package via the Locomotive Engineers' Mutual Life Insurance Association in 1867. Conductors followed by establishing their own fraternal order in 1868.

Five years later came the locomotive firemen's turn to establish a fraternal benefits society of their own. This organization, the Brotherhood of Locomotive Firemen (B of LF) was founded on December 1, 1873 in Port Jervis, New York by Joshua A. Leach and 10 other Erie Railroad firemen. These men had recently been forced to pass on the news of the fatal accident in a wreck of fellow fireman George Page to his grieving widow the previous month and decided to establish a mutual benefit society for those employed in the locomotive firemen's trade. Other lodges soon followed and within a year there were a dozen functioning local groups scattered about the states of New York, New Jersey, Ohio, Pennsylvania and Indiana. These met in convention in 1874 and adopted a first constitution for the organization and established a subsidiary institution called the Brotherhood of Locomotive Firemen's Life Insurance Association of the United States.

Indeed, the main practical purpose of the organization was its utility as a mutual insurance association, with each member to receive death benefit coverage of 50 cents per member up to a maximum of $1,000 for loss of life on the job. A second optional fund provided for disability benefits. In 1881, the death benefit was pegged at a fixed level of $1,000 in 1883, with no more than 3 settlements per month to be paid, with premiums set at 50 cents per month per member. Total disability through loss of an arm, leg, or eyesight on the job was to be treated the same as loss of life under the revised system.

In 1884, benefits were expanded, with the death benefit raised to $1,500. By February 1889, a total of $1.35 million had been paid out in benefits by the B of LF. A total of 18,000 locomotive firemen were members of the organization at that date.

As a general rule in the B of LF and the other similar railroad brotherhoods, death and permanent disability benefits were administered by the national organization while local lodges handled sickness and accident insurance through a separate fund, raised and disbursed independently of the national organization. During the decade of the 1880s, such a local assessment might amount to 50 cents per member per month. Local units also saw to the emotional support of ill or injured members, with committees visiting the bedridden and attempting to provide personal solace to family members.

=== Organizational form ===
Although B of LF lodge meetings were closed and private affairs, individual lodges periodically held formal balls, picnics and other social or fundraising activities open to the community

The B of LF in this early period organized itself into a network of "lodges", which provided a place for members to meet others in the profession to discuss matters of common concern. Social functions such as balls and picnics were periodically conducted under the B of LF's auspices. The organization also published a monthly magazine, The Firemen's Magazine (later Locomotive Firemen's Magazine), including railroad news of the day and articles appealing to the membership's professional interests. Little attention was paid to labor-management relations, with the B of LF mildly offering the suggestion that "the oldest firemen in service" should be promoted to positions as engineers "when they are competent and worthy, and opportunity offers".

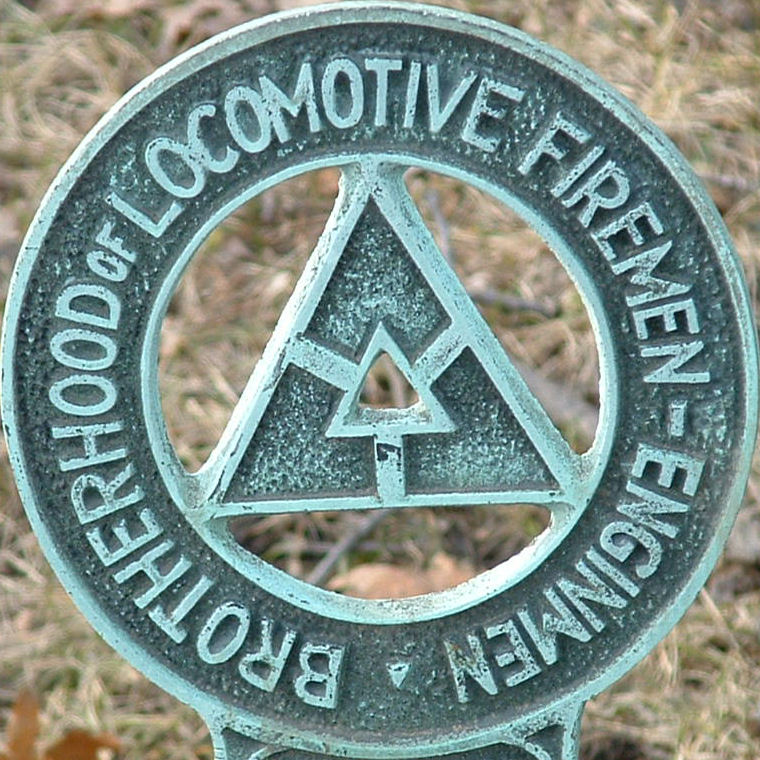
Grave marker for Brotherhood members.

The early B of LF took the form of a secret society, complete with an elaborate initiation ritual, membership oaths, secret signs of recognition, and formulaic protocol for the conduct of lodge meetings. Much of the original inspiration in this regard derived from the quasi-mystic religious tradition of Freemasonry. Meetings formally opened with a prayer conducted by the lodge chaplain and were modest and subdued, emphasizing the sacred task of the organization and the need for members to maintain appropriate decorum and professionalism in daily life.

In the B of LF's initiation ceremony of the 1870s, the initiate was seated in the darkened lodge room in front of a large backdrop used as a screen, while wearing a "hoodwink"—blindfolding headgear with retractable opaque lenses. First the prospective member was instructed by the lodge chaplain as to the benevolent purposes of the organization and the sacred duties of the members thereof. Next, lodge members then joined in by collectively reciting the four principles ensconced in the organization's motto "Protection, Charity, Sobriety, Industry".

At this point a stereopticon began to project a series of images on the screen, after each of which the lenses of the hoodwink were briefly raised and the image was explained to the initiate. First, a locomotive fireman leaving his family to go to work; then, a train with its crew industriously fulfilling their assigned task. Next came an image of a train wreck, followed by another of a funeral attended by members of the brotherhood, paying their respects to the deceased. This was followed by an image of a lodge representative relieving the grieving widow with a payment of the organization's death indemnity. Having witnessed his own symbolic death, the new candidate was thus made acutely aware both of the importance of his own support of families of maimed or fallen brothers in their time of need as well as the confidence that his own family would be provided for should he himself fall to misfortune.

The initiation experience was memorable and effective in building lasting commitments to the organization. Three decades after his own initiation into the Brotherhood of Locomotive Firemen, Eugene V. Debs recalled the evening as a watershed in his life:

A new purpose entered my life, a fresh force impelled me as I repeated the obligation to serve the 'brotherhood,' and I left that meeting with a totally different and far loftier ambition than I had ever known before.

Formulaic rituals and organizational secrecy also helped to insure that lodge meetings were orderly, intimate and confidential and contributed to group cohesion among B of LF members. The value of the B of LF's mission was emphasized, allowing serious-minded members a sense of personal fulfillment through participation in an important collective entity.

=== Membership exclusion ===
The benefits of membership in the Brotherhood of Locomotive Firemen were not universally available as the organization was based on the systematic exclusion of African American men and of women of all races. The organization's constitution in 1888 specified that membership requirements included that a candidate be a man "white born, of good moral character, sober and industrious, sound of body and limb". Additional de facto membership discrimination was practiced against recent unskilled immigrants from Europe, who were similarly held to be unsuitable for membership.

The white-only rule came up for debate in 1896-97, when the B of LF explored membership in the American Federation of Labor, only to learn that the AF of L would require the removal of the offending clause from the group's constitution. Rank and file membership erupted in protest over the change, flooding the organization with letters of protest, with members of lodges in the Southern United States most vociferous in their opposition. The racial exclusion was ruled unconstitutional in 1944 by the Supreme Court decision Tunstall v. Brotherhood of Locomotive Firemen and Enginemen.

The B of LF and other similar railroad brother hoods were, in short, based as much upon a process of exclusion as they were upon unification, as historian Mary Ann Clawson has noted in a 1989 book.

=== Leading officials ===
Frank P. Sargent, Grand Master of the B of LF from 1885 through 1902

The pioneer head of the Brotherhood of Locomotive Firemen during the decade of the 1870s was Frank W. Arnold (1851–1917). Arnold would be succeeded as Grand Master of the B of LF in 1885 by a man who would remain the iconic chief of the brotherhood for the rest of the 19th century, Frank P. Sargent. The New England-born Sargent remained the head official of the B of LF until 1902, when he was named Commissioner General of Immigration by Republican President Theodore Roosevelt.

The eventuality of a Grand Master's incapacity to serve was provided for by the periodic election of a Vice Grand Master, nominally the second ranking officer of the organization. In practice, however, the number two functionary in the "Grand Lodge" of officers of the B of LF was the Grand Secretary and Treasurer—running the organization's office on a day-to-day basis and providing for the publication of the B of LF's monthly magazine.

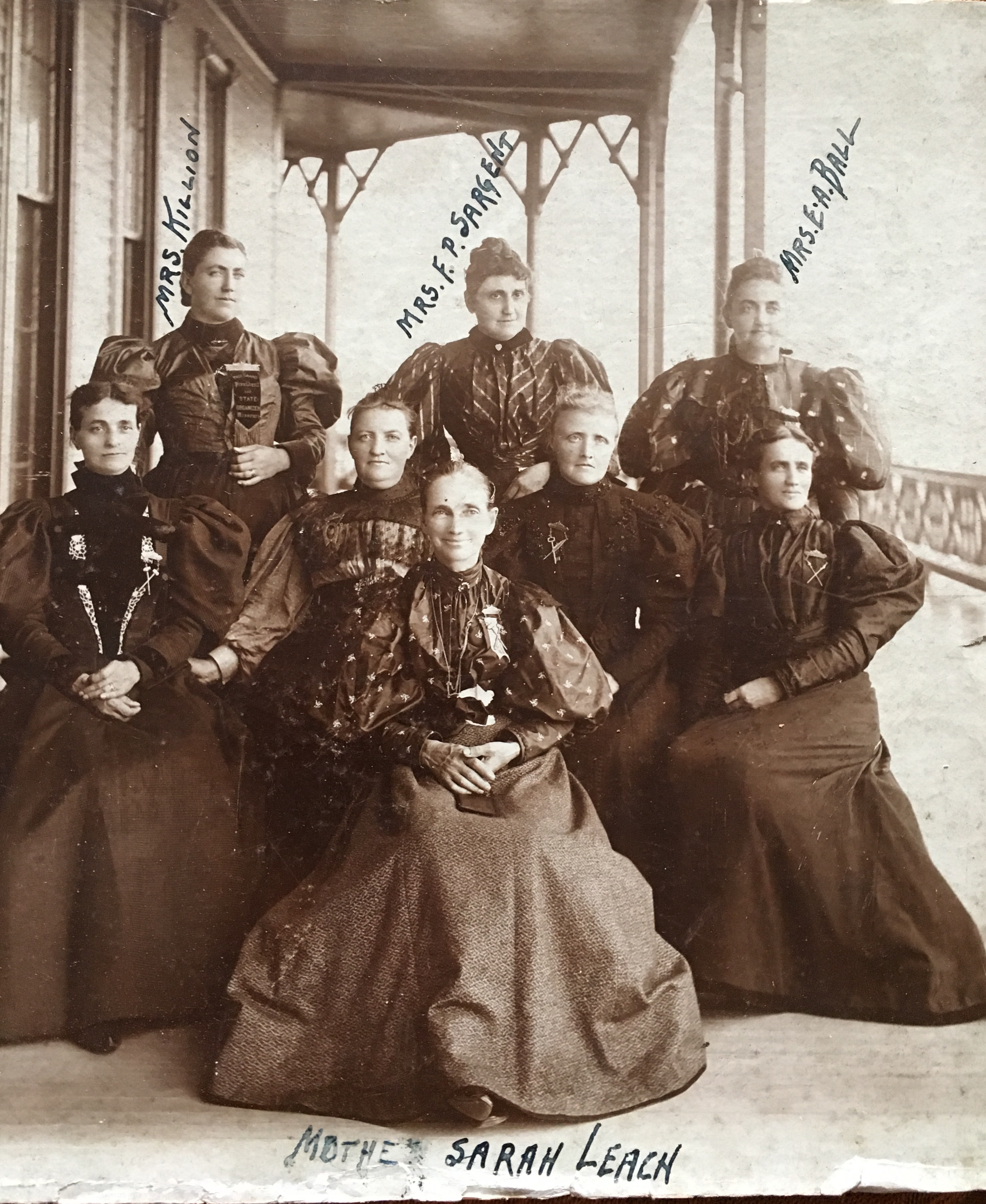
The wives of the B of LF organized the Fraternal Sisterhood and—though not members—played an important role in the operation of the Brotherhood (this photo was likely taken in the 1880s at an unknown location and it includes Mrs. Frank P. Sargent as well as "Mother" Sarah Leach, wife of founder Joshua A. Leach

The first Grand Secretary and Treasurer was William Sayre of Galion, Ohio, who professed to be a staunch advocate of the theory that personal virtue and good character, economic efficiency and a stable and democratic republic were closely interrelated. While Sayre espoused these sacred values on a theoretical plain, in practice his behavior seems to have been rather more profane. In July 1880, a young locomotive fireman turned city clerk from Terre Haute, Indiana named Eugene V. Debs was elected as Grand Secretary and Treasurer of the B of LF. Upon gaining access to the books, Debs discovered that his predecessor had been embezzling funds from the organization. With the B of LF about $6,000 in debt, Debs stabilized the organization's shaky finances with a promissory note which he personally backed and began a new era of careful financial management. Two years later, the Brotherhood had recovered, with nearly $13,000 in the bank to the credit of the organization's 6,000 members.

Debs was named editor of the Locomotive Firemen's Magazine in 1881 and he remained in that capacity and in the position of Grand Secretary and Treasurer until September 1894. While remaining supportive of the B of LF and its limited mission, over time Debs began to feel the insufficiency of a mere fraternal benefits to solve the fundamental problems facing locomotive firemen and other railway workers, which were often financial in nature and seemed to call for collective action.

In 1893, Debs was instrumental in forming an industrial union bringing together railway workers of all occupational tasks, the American Railway Union (ARU). This organization conducted several strikes for higher wages and better working conditions before ultimately being broken by judicial injunction in the 1894 Pullman strike.

=== Change of name ===
The 23rd Convention of the Brotherhood of Locomotive Firemen, held in Milwaukee in September 1906, took the step of expanding the scope of the organization and changing its name—an idea that had been discussed for many years previously. Over time a steady stream of the organization's members had been promoted to the position of Engineer while remaining inside the organization. This presented a situation in which the organization's name did not reflect its actual membership composition. Despite great sympathy for the traditional organizational moniker, the convention voted to formally acknowledge the participation of engineers among its membership and changed its name to the Brotherhood of Locomotive Firemen and Enginemen (B of LF&E).

This change went into effect on January 1, 1907.

=== Disestablishment and legacy ===
In 1969, the union merged with the Order of Railway Conductors and Brakemen, the Brotherhood of Railroad Trainmen and the Switchmen's Union of North America to form the United Transportation Union.

A massive collection of materials of the B of LF&E, including over 200 linear feet of minutes, bulletins, correspondence, internal documents and other ephemera is housed at the Kheel Center for Labor-Management Documentation and Archives at the library of Cornell University in Ithaca, New York.

== Conventions and membership size ==
Sources: D.B. Robertson, "Celebration of the 50th Anniversary of the B of LF&E", pp. 7–28; Published convention proceedings, various; American Labor Year Book, 1926, pp. 106–107; ALYB, 1929, p. 131; ALYB, 1932, pp. 63–65. The title of "Grand Master" was changed to "International President" at the convention of 1908.

Convention	Dates	Location	Lodges	Members	Grand Master Elected
1st Convention	December 15–18, 1874	Hornell, NY	12	N/A	Joshua A. Leach
2nd Annual	December 14–18, 1875	Indianapolis	31	900	Joshua A. Leach
3rd Annual	September 12–16, 1876	St. Louis	53	N/A	William R. Worth
4th Annual	September 11–15, 1877	Indianapolis	60	N/A	Frank B. Alley
5th Annual	September 10–14, 1878	Buffalo	51	N/A (fewer)	William T. Goundie
6th Annual	September 8–13, 1879	Chicago	65	N/A	Frank W. Arnold
7th Annual	September 13-17, 1880	Chicago	N/A	N/A	Frank W. Arnold
8th Annual	September 12–15, 1881	Boston	95	2,998	Frank W. Arnold
9th Annual	September 11–15, 1882	Terre Haute	121	4,443	Frank W. Arnold
10th Annual	September 18–21, 1883	Denver	178	7,337	Frank W. Arnold
11th Annual	September 23–29, 1884	Toronto	237	12,246	Frank W. Arnold
12th Annual	September 21–29, 1885	Philadelphia	285	14,694	Frank P. Sargent
13th Annual	September 15–21, 1886	Minneapolis	331	16,196	Frank P. Sargent
14th Convention	September 10–19, 1888	Atlanta	383	18,278	Frank P. Sargent
15th Convention	September 8–15, 1890	San Francisco	430	18,657	Frank P. Sargent
16th Convention	September 12–21, 1892	Cincinnati	480	25,967	Frank P. Sargent
17th Convention	September 10–20, 1894	Harrisburg, PA	519	26,508	Frank P. Sargent
18th Convention	September 14–??, 1896	Galveston, TX	507	22,461	Frank P. Sargent
19th Convention	September 12–??, 1898	Toronto	538	27,039	Frank P. Sargent
20th Convention	September 10–??, 1900	Des Moines, IA	569	36,084	Frank P. Sargent
21st Convention	September 8–??, 1902	Chattanooga, TN	615	43,376	John J. Hannahan
22nd Convention	September 12–??, 1904	Buffalo	660	54,434	John J. Hannahan
23rd Convention	September 10–??, 1906	Milwaukee	699	58,849	John J. Hannahan
24th Convention	September 14–??, 1908	Columbus, OH	760	66,408	William S. Carter
25th Convention	June 6–??, 1910	St. Paul, MN	759	65,315	William S. Carter
26th Convention	June 2–??, 1913	Washington, D.C.	826	85,292	William S. Carter
27th Convention	June 5–??, 1916	Denver	830	85,866	William S. Carter
28th Convention	June 9–??, 1919	Denver	880	116,990	William S. Carter
29th Convention	May 8–??, 1922	Houston	905	107,611	David B. Robertson
30th Convention	June 1–??, 1925	Detroit	No data	106,808	David B. Robertson
31st Convention	June 11–??, 1928	San Francisco	No data	104,167	David B. Robertson
32nd Convention	June 8–??, 1931	Columbus, OH	No data	98,187	David B. Robertson

== See also ==
- List of American railway unions
- Tunstall v. The Brotherhood of Locomotive Firemen and Enginemen

== Official magazine ==
- Locomotive Firemen's Magazine (established December 1876)

Vol. 1 (1876) | Vol. 2 (1877) | Vol. 3 (1879) | Vol. 4 (1880) | Vol. 5 (1881) | Vol. 6 (1882) | Vol. 7 (1883) | Vol. 8 (1884) | Vol. 9 (1885) | Vol. 10 (1886) | Vol. 11 (1887) | Vol. 12 (1888) | Vol. 13 (1889) | Vol. 14 (1890) | Vol. 15 (1891) | Vol. 16 (1892) | Vol. 17 (1893) | Vol. 18 (1894) | Vol. 19 (1895) |
