= Redwing (disambiguation) =

The redwing (Turdus iliacus) is a type of bird in the thrush family.

Red Wing(s) or Redwing(s) may also refer to:

== Arts and entertainment ==
- Red Wing (film), a 2013 Western starring Bill Paxton
- Redwing (Marvel Comics), the pet bird and sidekick of the Marvel Comics character Falcon
- Redwing, one of the Teen Titans in DC Comics
- Redwing, an Amalgam Comics character
- Redwing (book), a fantasy novel by Holly Bennett
- "Red Wing" (song), a 1907 song by Kerry Mills and Thurland Chattaway
- Red Wings, an airship squadron in the video game Final Fantasy IV
- Redwing Records, an independent record label founded by Bonnie Raitt

== People ==
- Joan Redwing, materials scientist and professor at Pennsylvania State University
- Tatankamani or Red Wing II (c. 1755–1829), Native American leader of the Mdewakanton Dakota
- Princess Red Wing (1896–1987), Native American elder, historian, folklorist and museum curator
- Red Wing (actress) (1884–1974), Native American silent film actress born Lillian St. Cyr

== Places ==
=== Canada ===
- Red Wing, a community in the town of The Blue Mountains, Ontario
- Redwing, Saskatchewan, a community north of Prince Albert, Saskatchewan

=== United States ===
- Red Wing, Colorado, an unincorporated community
- Redwing, Kansas, an unincorporated community
- Red Wing crater, North Dakota
- Red Wing, Minnesota, a city
- Redwing, West Virginia, an unincorporated community

== Sports ==
- Adirondack Red Wings, a former minor league ice hockey team
- Redwings, the sports teams of Benet Academy, a high school in Lisle, Illinois, United States
- Camp Redwing, a defunct Girl Scout camp in Renfew, Pennsylvania, United States.
- Detroit Red Wings, a National Hockey League team
- Fredericton Red Wings, a junior ice hockey team in the Maritime Junior A Hockey League
- Hamilton Red Wings, a junior ice hockey team in the Ontario Hockey Association operating between 1960 and 1974
- Rochester Red Wings, a minor league baseball team
- Weyburn Red Wings, a junior hockey team in Weyburn, Saskatchewan, Canada
- Red Wing Manufacturers, a minor league baseball team based in Red Wing, Minnesota, in 1910 and 1911
- Red Wing Stadium, original name of Silver Stadium, Rochester, New York, United States

== Transportation ==
=== Aviation ===
- AEA Red Wing, a pioneer aircraft designed by Thomas Selfridge in 1908 and flown by F. W. Baldwin
- Krasniye Kryl'ya, known in English as "Red Wings", a Russian aircraft manufacturer
- Red Wings Airlines, a Russian airline formerly known as Airlines 400
- Red Wing Regional Airport, Wisconsin, near Red Wing, Minnesota

=== Rail ===
- 227 series, train type operating in the Hiroshima area of Japan, branded as "Red Wing"
- Red Wing station, an Amtrak train station in Red Wing, Minnesota
- Red Wing, an international night train operated by the Canadian Pacific Railway and Boston and Maine Railroad, between Montreal and Boston. See Alouette (train).

=== Other transportation ===
- Red Wing Bridge, a bridge over the Mississippi River connecting Wisconsin to Red Wing, Minnesota
- Redwing (keelboat), an in-shore keelboat from Bembridge, Isle of Wight, England
- Redwing Coaches, an English bus operator

== Vessels ==
- HMS Redwing, several ships of the Royal Navy
- USS Redwing, several American naval ships
- USFS Red Wing, a United States Bureau of Fisheries fishery patrol vessel in commission from 1928 to 1939

== Other uses ==
- Pterolobium, a genus of shrubs ranging from Africa to Asia, sometimes called "redwings"
- Operation Redwing, a nuclear test series conducted by the United States
- Operation Red Wings, a 2005 US counterterrorism mission in Kunar province, Afghanistan
- Redwings Horse Sanctuary, a UK charity that looks after rescued horses and ponies
- Red Wing Pottery, American stoneware, pottery, or dinnerware items made in Red Wing, Minnesota
- Red wings (sexual act), cunnilingus performed on a menstruating partner
- Red Wing Shoes, a footwear company specializing in durable boots
- Red Wing Seminary, a former Lutheran Church seminary in Red Wing, Minnesota
- Red Wing High School, Red Wing, Minnesota
- Minnesota Correctional Facility – Red Wing, a juvenile correctional facility in Red Wing, Minnesota

== See also ==
- East Red Wing, Minnesota
- North Red Wing, Wisconsin
- Red-winged blackbird (Agelaius phoeniceus), a New World blackbird abundant in North America
