= Hemmestveit =

Hemmestveit is a Norwegian surname. Notable people with the surname include:

- Mikkjel Hemmestveit (1863–1957), Norwegian–American Nordic skier
- Torjus Hemmestveit (1860–1930), Norwegian Nordic skier
