= KLCH =

Coordinates: 44.487°N 92.232°W

- Lake City, Minnesota; United States
- Broadcast area: Southern Minnesota
- Frequency: 94.9 MHz
- Branding: Lake Hits 95

Programming
- Format: Oldies
- Affiliations: Fox News Radio

Ownership
- Owner: Q Media Group, LLC
- Sister stations: KCUE, KWNG, WPVW

History
- First air date: 2001

Technical information
- Licensing authority: FCC
- Facility ID: 89398
- Class: A
- ERP: 5,000 watts
- HAAT: 100 meters

Links
- Public license information: Public file; LMS
- Webcast: Listen Live
- Website: lakehits95.com

KLCH (94.9 FM) is a radio station located in Lake City, Minnesota. They are owned Q Media Group, LLC. Lake Hits 95 transmits their signal from a 328-foot height above average terrain antenna located southeast of Stockholm, Wisconsin. They broadcast using 5,000 watts of power and have a coverage area of about 45 miles.

== Programming ==
Lake Hits signed on the air in 2001 with an adult contemporary format. KLCH switched to the current oldies format in July 2007. Lake Hits 95 studios are located in Lake City and Red Wing. KLCH carries Lake City high school sports, local news, and weather twice per hour from the Weathereye Weather Center in Woodbury, Minnesota.
