= Brewster-Wheeler Recreation Center =

Coordinates: 42°20′49.0″N 83°02′49.2″W

The Brewster-Wheeler Recreation Center is a former recreation center located in Detroit, Michigan. Opened in 1929, it was a hub for community enrichment programs for those who lived in the city, especially those who lived in the Brewster and Brush Park neighborhoods. The recreation center was closed in 2006 as a result of lack of funding and decrease in usage. As of 2015, the City of Detroit is planning a multi-use redevelopment for the site, complete with restaurants, residential units, and commercial space.

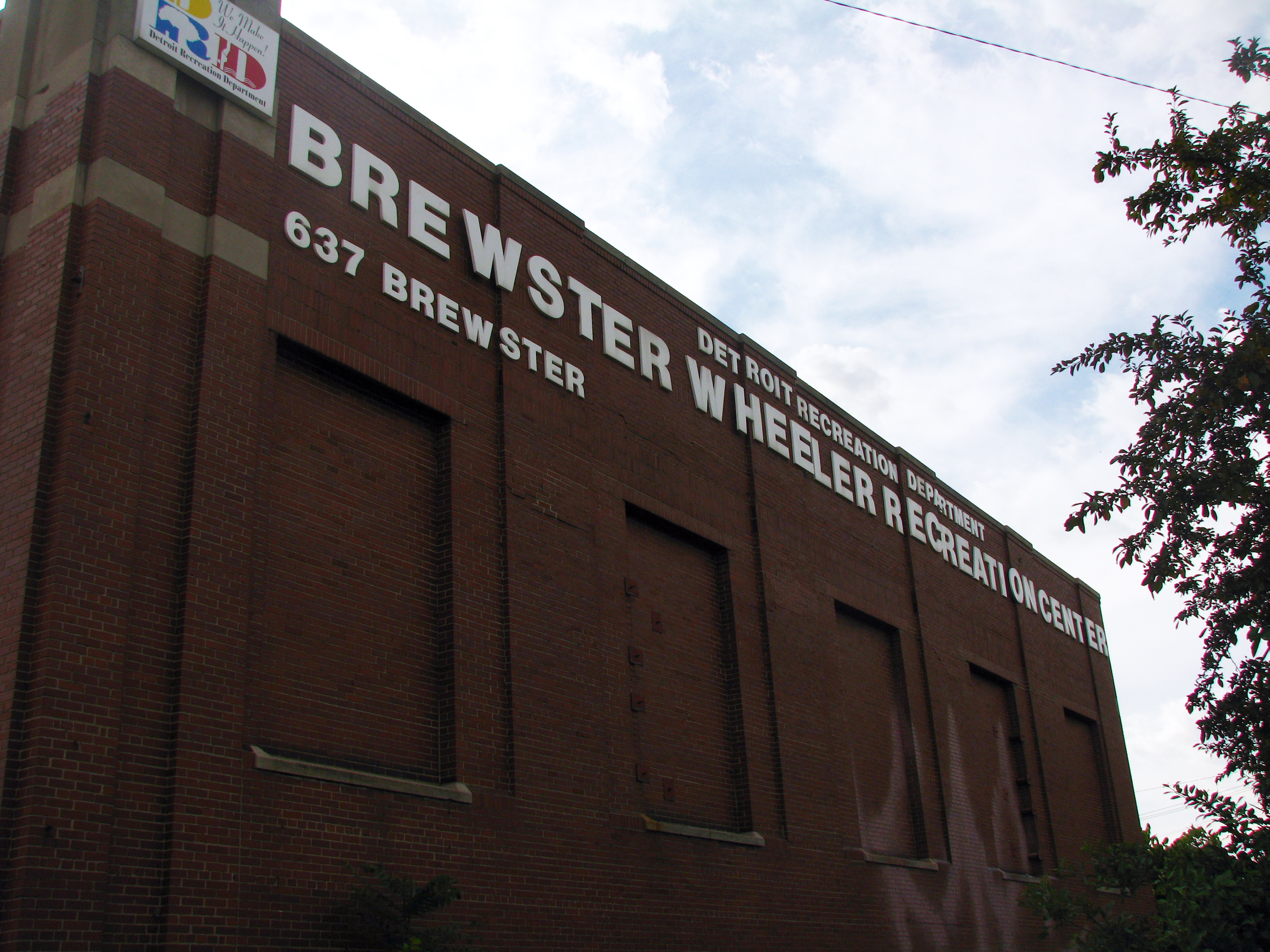
Image of the exterior of Detroit's Brewster-Wheeler Recreation Center, 2011

== History as Brewster-Wheeler Recreation Center ==
The Brewster-Wheeler Recreation Center is a building with a long history that served an underprivileged community for many years. It spanned from its early days as the only public library in a low-income neighborhood to its later years as an athletic center. Notably, it was home to athletes like Joe Louis.

The Detroit Public Library set up a branch on Hastings and Wilkins in 1913. Its purpose was to provide resources to poor immigrant neighborhoods on the outskirts of the downtown. A few years after the Hastings location was opened plans for a new permanent location to be built were in the works. The new location would be built west of Hastings and Wilkins on Brewster Street. The library was built of cut stone and beautiful brick. The building was finished and opened on May 15, 1917. The library was closed down only ten years later in 1927 due to a lack of use. The now eleven-year-old building was put up for sale and the public library was moved back to its original location on Hastings in 1928.

The 1920s saw an influx of black immigrants from the south moving into the surrounding communities of Black Bottom and Paradise Valley. The Detroit Parks Department began to realize that this community lacked any real recreation center. This forced their hand to begin a $500,000 renovation of the old library into a community center. A brand new two-story wing added designed by George W. Graves, added classrooms, a swimming pool, boxing ring, and basketball courts. The existing library was then converted to an auditorium.

The Central Community Center officially opened its doors to the public in October 1929. 5000 people came out to the dedication on November 1 (Source 1) Mayor John C. Nagle spoke of the changing composition of the surrounding neighborhood stating, "I dedicate this building for the people of the city of Detroit, regardless of race, color or creed. I realize that much prejudice exists in Detroit, but a building of this kind will wipe it out"

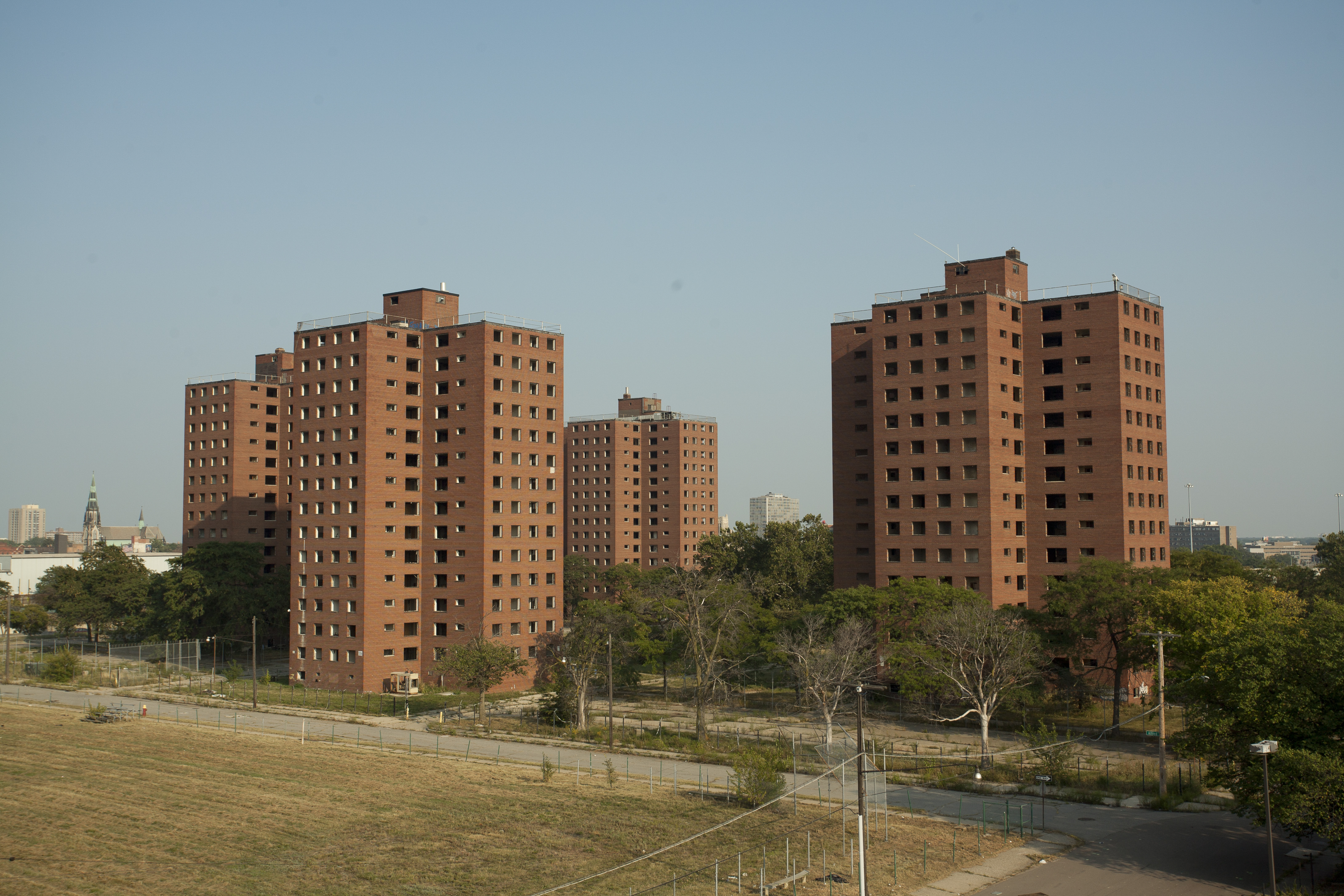
Frederick Douglass Housing Project Towers which overlooked the Brewster-Douglass Residential Development

The 1930s brought major changes to the surrounding community of the recreation center. Housing officials using government funding chose Black Bottom as the site of the new Brewster Homes. The Brewster Project began construction in 1935 when then First Lady Eleanor Roosevelt broke ground on the new housing development. Over the next 20 years the housing project would grow into the largest residential project owned by the city of Detroit. Primarily very low-income African American families would occupy the projects. The Brewster Homes would engulf the recreation center consisting of mostly low-rise apartment structures. It would not be until the 1940s and 50's that the larger apartment structure complexes would be added to the housing development. The towers alone were home to over 10,000 local residents and a majority of them used the recreation center as a place on entertainment, learning, and shelter.

The desirability to live in the Brewster homes began to decline in the 1960s due to a lack of maintenance and housing standards by the city. In combination with the construction of Interstate-75, which displaced thousands of black residents and wiped out the surrounding culture housed on Hastings Street the surrounding area began to move into despair. Crime increased and the surrounding community was in disarray. The Brewster Center was the only place of safety and shelter for a majority of the residents still residing in the housing development. It was not until 1969 that the recreation center was named the Brewster-Wheeler Recreation Center. It was renamed in honor of Leon Wheeler.

Leon Wheeler was the cities first black recreation employee in 1919. Wheeler managed the recreation center from 1919 to 1945. In his tenure he established programs including swimming, boxing, track, tennis, drama, and dancing. Over 81 different clubs met at the center's six classrooms every day. The Brewster-Wheeler Recreation Center was a place of safety and growth for thousands of children. It gave the children an outlet other than the streets through its athletic programs, and summer classes.

The recreation center grew harder to maintain in the later years. The center turned to donations from famous alumni such as University of Michigan and NBA star Chris Webber. Webber was responsible for donating a brand new gymnasium in the 1990s. By the mid 2000s the Brewster Projects were mostly abandoned. The center continued to offer programs but began plans to shut its doors in 2007. The recreation center officially closed it doors for good on August 25, 2006. Less than three years later the building was vacant and abandoned.

In the following years the abandoned building became home to a large homeless population. Metal thieves also ravaged the building for scraps as graffiti artists used the building as a blank canvas. After a series of fires demolition plans by the city began to take shape in 2013. After fighting for historical significance and renovation local community organizer, Donyetta Hill fought to secure the building and save it from the bulldozers. Interest in the recreation building has sparked new beginnings and a major renovation.

== Redevelopment ==
Towards the end of 2014, the Brewster-Wheeler Recreation Center was set to be torn down. The center had been closed for nearly 8 years, and the building was becoming worn-down and weathered due to the elements. However, Donyetta Hill organized several people, held meetings and gathered over 7,000 signed petitions. Donyetta did research for several months on Brewster Wheeler. She convinced the city of Detroit to preserve the building, and at the beginning of 2015, Mayor Mike Duggan announced a $50 million plan for the redevelopment of the center led by the Detroit City Council and city Councilwoman Mary Sheffield. The current plan is to develop the building into a restaurant, bar, and a community center while also building affordable housing on-site as well. However, due to a lack of space, the housing portion of the project is being relocated to another location within Brush Park.

The redevelopment of the actual recreation center is being spearheaded by Curt Catallo, owner of Union Joints restaurant group, and his partner K.C. Crain Jr., executive vice president of Crain Communications Inc. Catallo specializes in repurposing buildings, and this project presents a golden opportunity for him. He plans on incorporating the history of the building into the design of the restaurant, including the boxing ring and gym that Joe Louis once trained in. The restaurant is going to sit on top of the basketball court that the Harlem Globetrotters played their first away game on, and there will be a bar that is built where the boxing ring of Joe Louis used to be. Also, a Joe Louis mural is going to be incorporated into the design, and there will be a brewery built where the swimming pool was once located. Furthermore, the project will also include a kitchen incubator, culinary arts studio, catering space, community and meeting space, and outdoor event space. Once the redevelopment is complete, a few Detroit based clubs will be given space within the center to operate. The Detroit Chess Club will be given event space within the center, and Slow Roll Inc, a nonprofit weekly Monday night group bicycle ride, will be headquartered in the building. Finally, girls involved in the Alternative for Girls program, a program that serves girls who are homeless or at risk of becoming homeless, will have preference in the culinary arts training program. When the plans were first announced, construction was supposed to begin in 2015 with the project being completed by 2016, however, there have been delays, so construction is slated to begin in 2017.

This project will also be giving back to the community surrounding the Brewster-Wheeler Center by creating approximately 300 jobs, with 120 of them being full-time. During the construction, Catallo has agreed to have at least 51% of the construction staff be Detroit workers. Additionally, 40% of the restaurant workers will be Detroit residents with a goal of increasing that to 70% within four years after the restaurant is opened.

On April 3, 2026, it was announced that Darren McCarty, a former Red Wings player and professional wrestler, would open a $1-million professional wrestling training facility with trainers such as Alex Shelley and Trey Miguel.

== Notable people ==
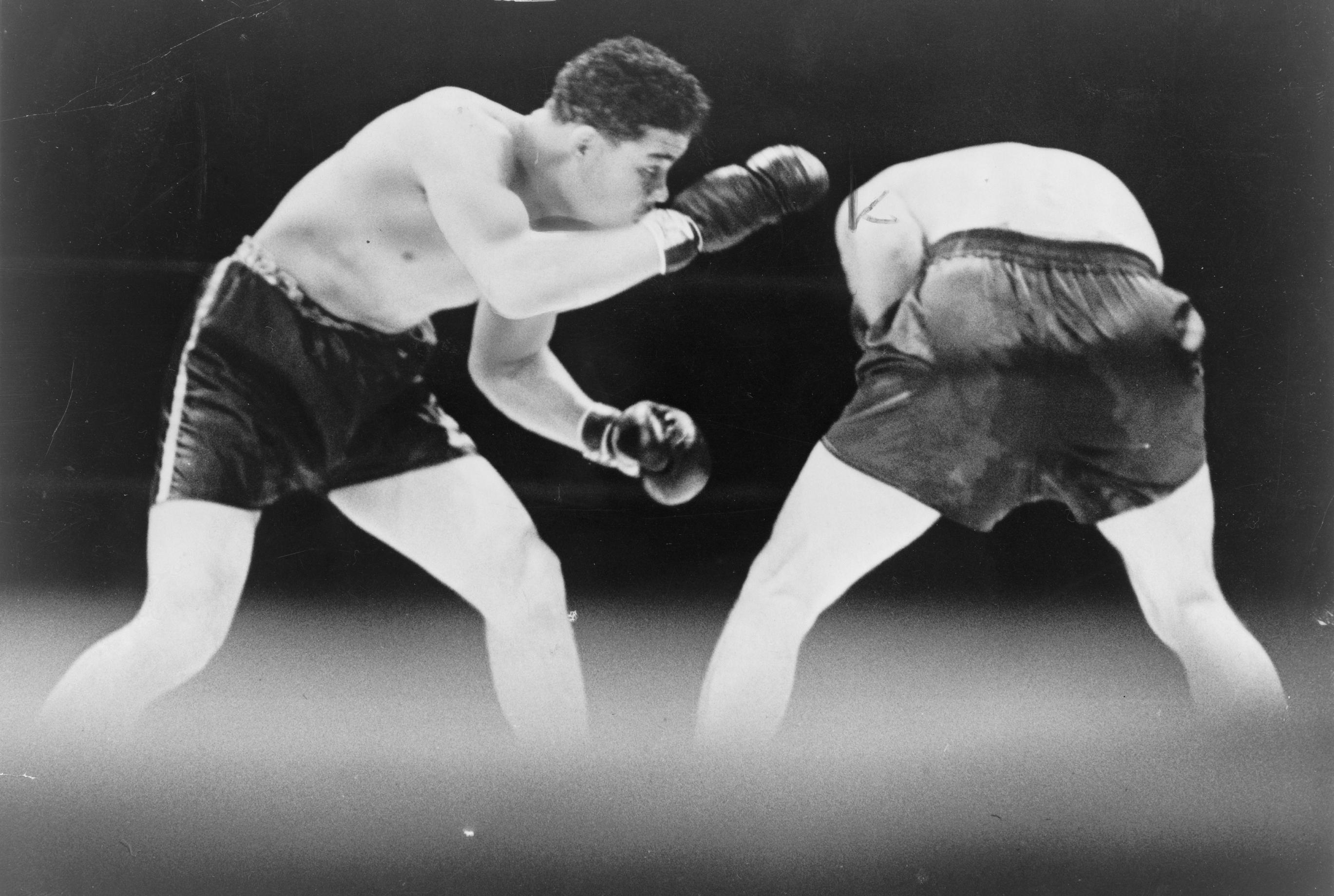
Joe Louis' famous fight against Max Schmeling in 1936

- Joe Louis, famed boxing champion, formerly trained in the basement of the Brewster-Wheeler Recreation Center
- The Harlem Globetrotters played their first road game at the center in 1932.
- Sugar Ray Robinson accompanied Louis on trips to the Brewster Center before he moved to Harlem at the age of 14.
- Eddie Futch sparred with Louis and Robinson at the Brewster Center, eventually becoming the trainer of Joe Frazier and multiple other boxers.
- Emanuel Steward started his boxing career at the Brewster Center before moving on to train the likes of Oscar De La Hoya, Evander Holyfield, and Miguel Cotto.

== KRONK Gym (2025–present) ==
In December 2025, the Brewster-Wheeler Recreation Center became the new home of Kronk Gym, one of the world's most celebrated boxing institutions. The gym's original facility at 5555 McGraw Avenue had closed in 2006 and was destroyed by fire in 2017. The return of KRONK to the Brewster-Wheeler Center was announced at a June 4, 2025 press conference alongside Detroit Mayor Mike Duggan. The 3,500-square-foot facility opened on December 10, 2025, and is led by CEO Paul Bhatti and COO John Lepak, with head trainer Johnathon Banks — who was personally designated by Emanuel Steward as his successor. The building's historic connection to boxing — through Joe Louis, Sugar Ray Robinson, Eddie Futch, and Emanuel Steward — made it a natural home for the KRONK revival.
