= KMFX =

KMFX may refer to:

- KMFX-FM, a radio station (102.5 FM) licensed to serve Lake City, Minnesota, United States
- WPVW, a radio station (1190 AM) licensed to serve Wabasha, Minnesota, which used the call sign KMFX from 1994 to 2011
