= Americana =

Materials characteristic of the United States of America

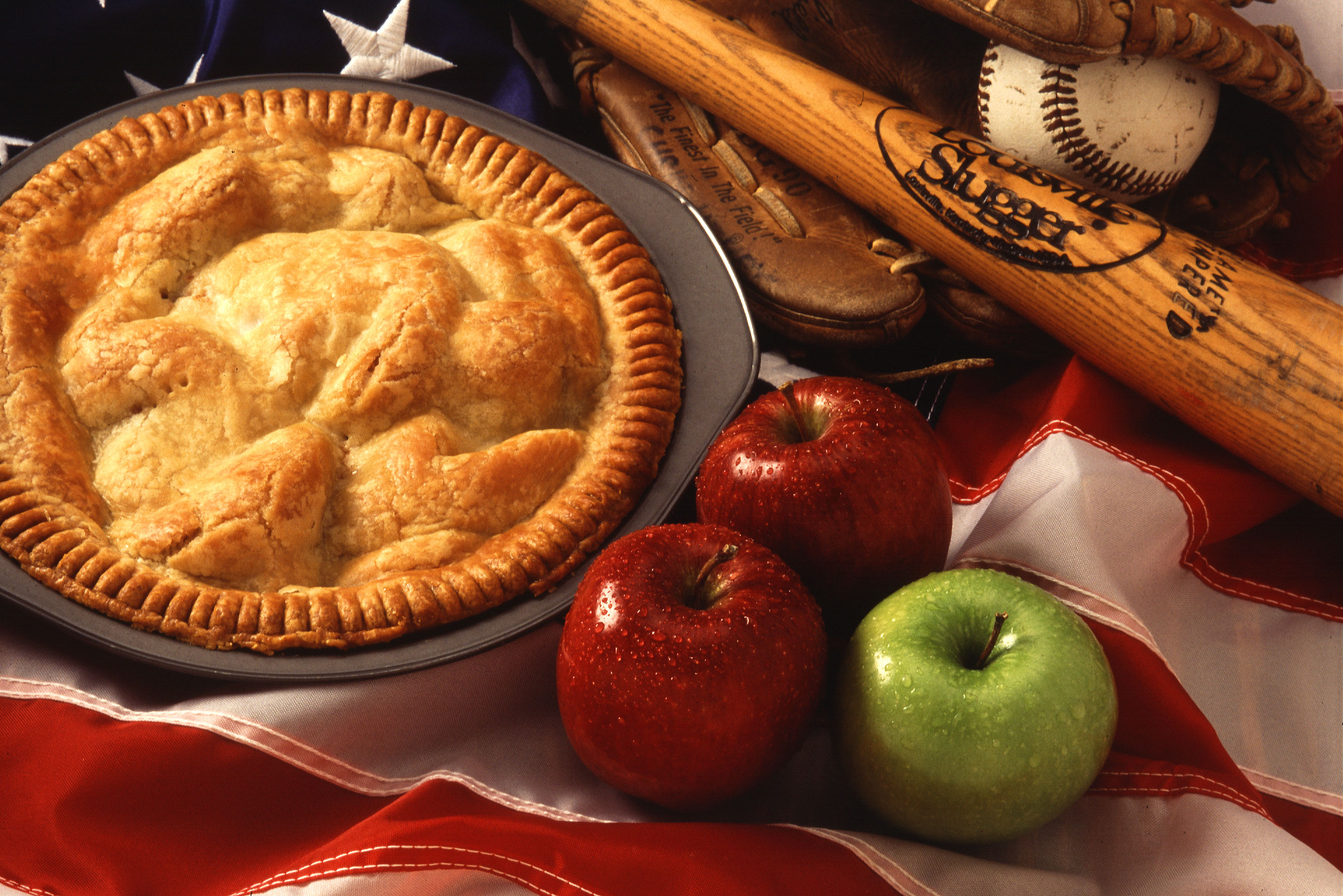
Apple pie, baseball, and the United States flag, three well-known icons associated with Americana

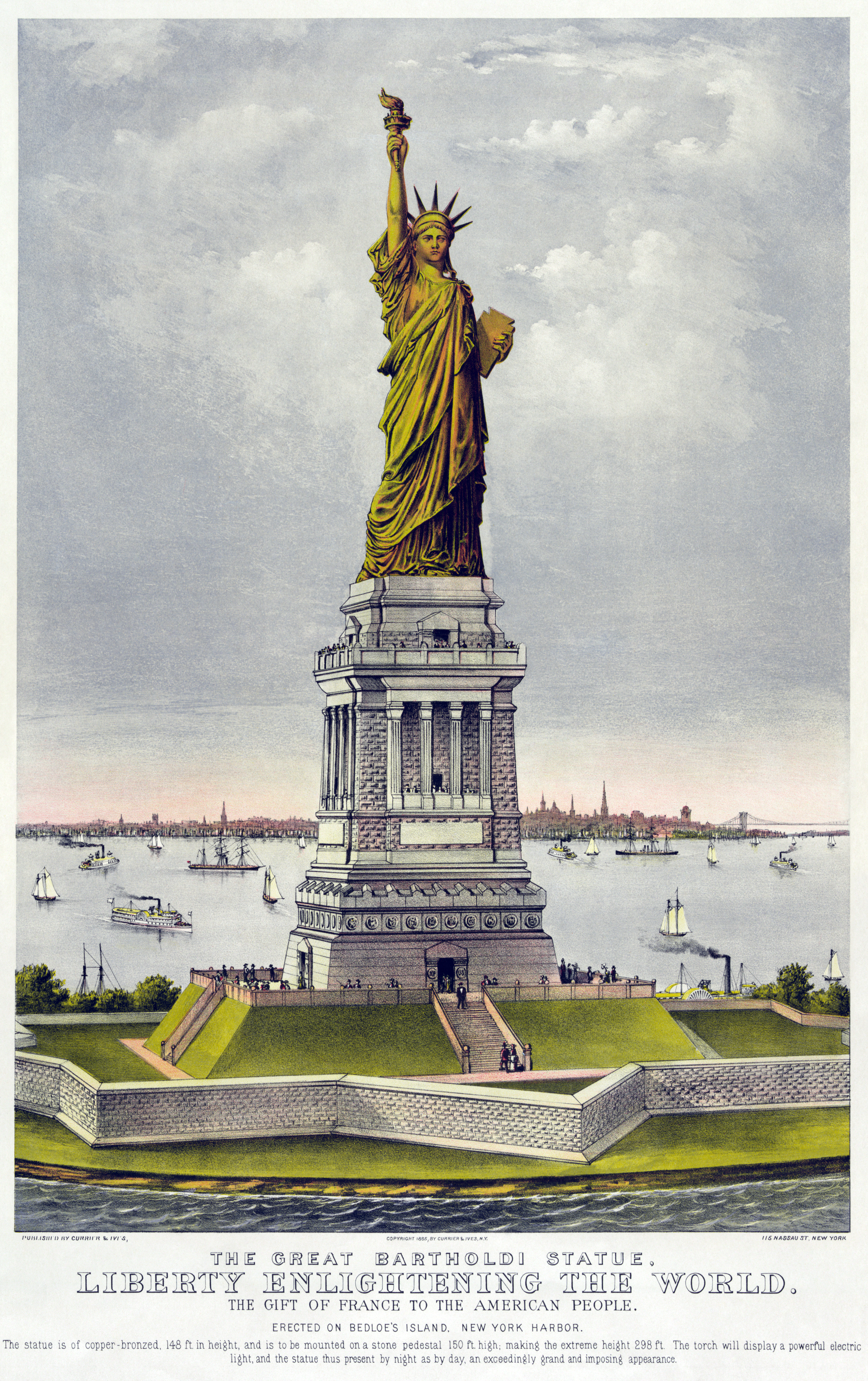
Liberty Enlightening the World, a print version of the portrait of the Statue of Liberty by Currier and Ives

Americana artifacts are related to the history, geography, folklore, and cultural heritage of the United States of America. Americana is any collection of materials and things concerning or characteristic of the United States or of the American people, and is representative or even stereotypical of American culture as a whole.

What is and is not considered Americana is heavily influenced by national identity, historical context, patriotism and nostalgia. The ethos or guiding beliefs or ideals which have come to characterize America, such as the American Dream, are central to the idea. Americana encompasses not only material objects but also people, places, concepts and historical eras which are popularly identified with American culture.

The name Americana also refers to Americana music, a genre of contemporary music that incorporates elements of various American music styles, including country, roots rock, folk, bluegrass, and blues, resulting in a distinctive roots-oriented sound.

== As nostalgia ==
From the mid to late 20th century, Americana was largely conceptualized as a nostalgia for an idealized life in small towns and cities in the United States around the turn of the century, roughly in the period between 1880 and the First World War. It was believed that much of the structure of 20th-century American life and culture had been cemented in that time and place. American author Henry Seidel Canby wrote:

It is the small town, the small city, that is our heritage. We have made twentieth-century America from it, and some account of these communities as they were ... we owe our children and grandchildren.

Many kinds of cultural artifacts fall within the definition of Americana: the things involved need not be old, but are usually associated with some quintessential element of the American experience. Each period of United States history is reflected by the advertising and marketing of the time, and the various types of antiques, collectibles, memorabilia and vintage items from these time periods are typical of what is popularly considered Americana. The Atlantic described the term as "slang for the comforting, middle-class ephemera at your average antique store—things like needle-pointed pillows, Civil War daguerreotypes, and engraved silverware sets".

The nostalgia for this period was based on a remembrance of confidence in American life that had emerged during the period due to such factors as a sense that the frontier had finally been "conquered", with the U.S. Census Bureau's declaration that it was "closed" in 1890, as well as the recent victory in the Spanish–American War. By 1912, the contiguous United States was at last fully politically incorporated, and the idea of the nation as a single, solid unity could begin to take hold.

As Canby put it,

Americans at this time "really believed all they heard on the Fourth of July or read in school readers. They set on one plane of time, and that the present, the Declaration of Independence, the manifest destiny of America, the new plumbing, the growth of the factory system, the morning paper, and the church sociable. It was all there at once, better than elsewhere, their own, and permanent. ... They had just the country they wanted...and they believed it would be the same, except for more bathtubs and faster trains, forever ... for the last time in living memory everyone knew exactly what it meant to be an American."

On growing up Italian-American, novelist Don DeLillo stated:

It's no accident that my first novel was called Americana. This was a private declaration of independence, a statement of my intention to use the whole picture, the whole culture. America was and is the immigrant's dream, and as the son of two immigrants I was attracted by the sense of possibility that had drawn my grandparents and parents.

— Conversations With Don DeLillo

The zeitgeist of this idealized period is captured in Disneyland and Magic Kingdom's Main Street, U.S.A. section (which was inspired by both Walt Disney's hometown of Marceline, Missouri and Harper Goff's childhood home of Fort Collins, Colorado), as well as the musical and movie The Music Man and Thornton Wilder's stage play Our Town. Especially revered in nostalgic Americana are small-town institutions like the barber shop, drug store, soda fountain and ice cream parlor; some of these were eventually resurrected by mid-twentieth century nostalgia for the time period in businesses like the Farrell's Ice Cream Parlour chain, with its 1890s theme.

== Examples ==
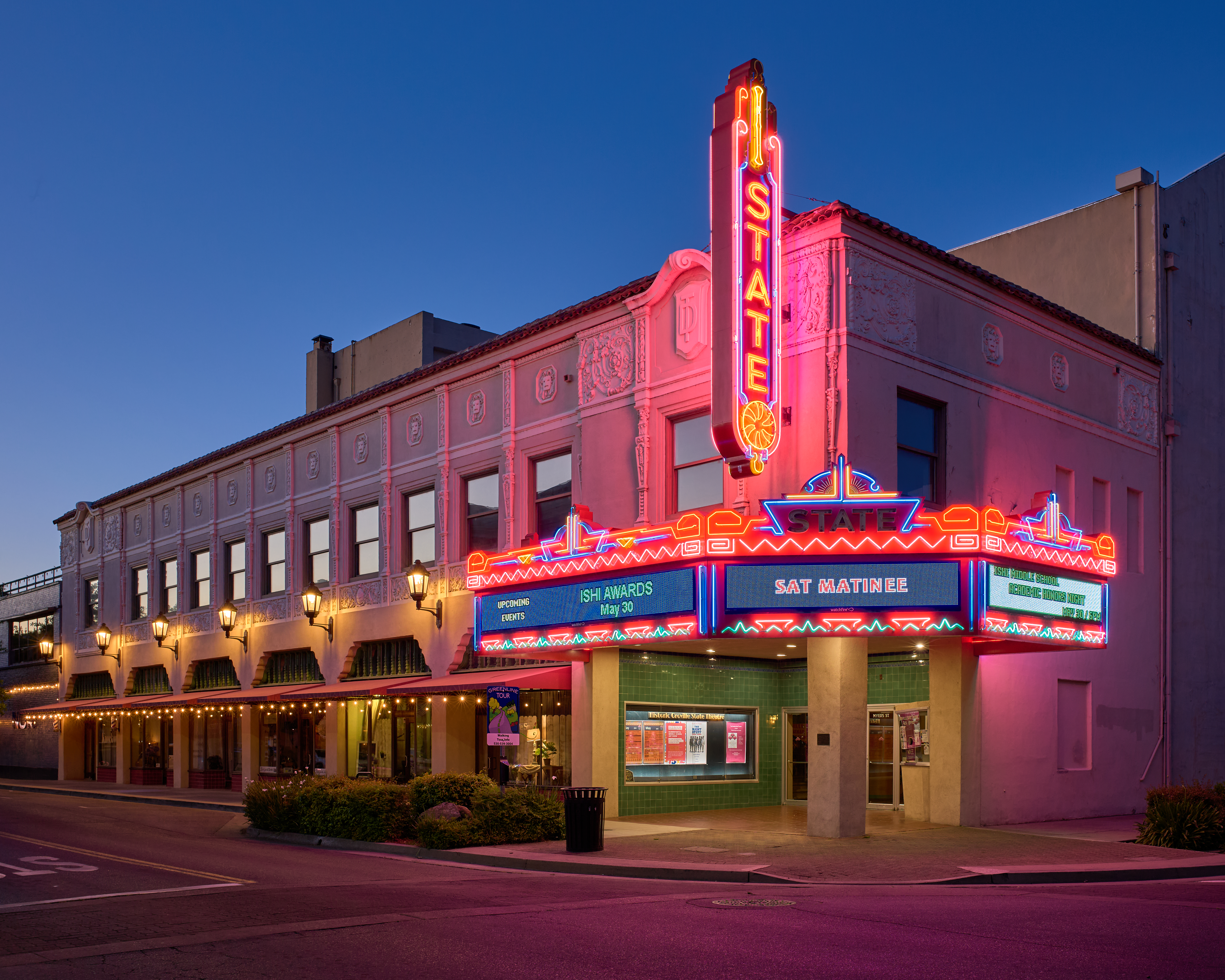
Americana in architecture: the Oroville State Theatre in the historic downtown of Oroville, a former gold mining town in Northern California

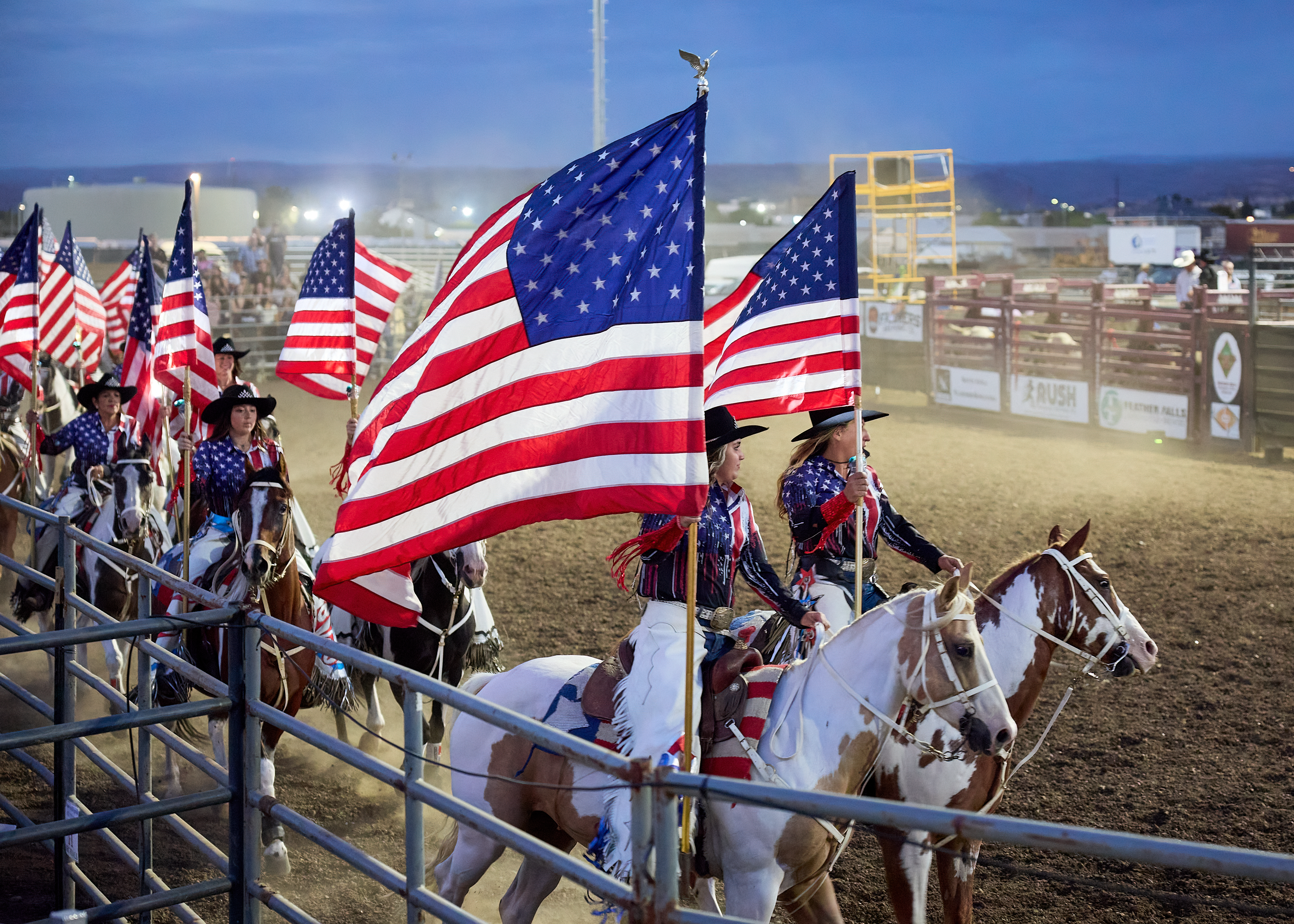
Flag girls at a Rodeo

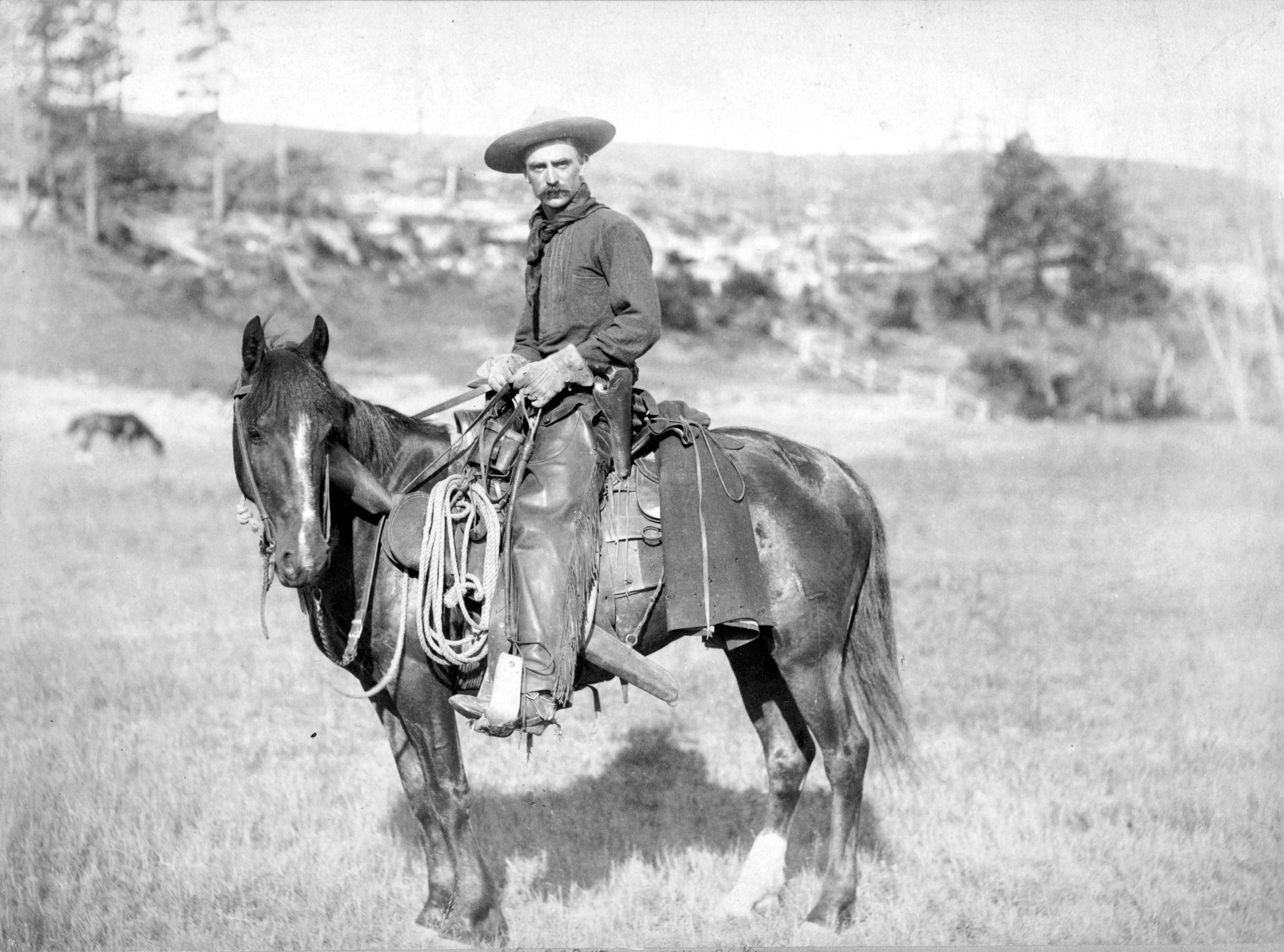
Cowboys are a quintessential figure of the Wild West and American frontier.

=== Cultural symbols ===
- American football
- Baseball
- Flag of the United States
- Fourth of July
- Mount Rushmore
- Route 66
- Small town
- Statue of Liberty
- Tent revival
- Thanksgiving
- White picket fence
- Wild West

=== Food ===
- Apple pie
- Barbecue
- Bubble gum
- Buffalo wings
- Hamburgers
- Hot dogs
- Fried chicken
- Milkshake
- Pizza, American-style

=== Music ===
- Blues
- Jazz
- Rock and roll
- "The Star-Spangled Banner"
- Hip-Hop

=== Religion ===
- Camp meeting
- Tent revival

=== Clothing and fashion ===
- Blue jeans
- Motorcycle jacket
- Denim jacket
- Workwear

=== Brand names ===
- Chevrolet
- Coca-Cola
- Levi's

== Similar concepts ==
- Regional
  - Floridiana, artifacts relating to the state of Florida.
  - Hawaiiana, Native Hawaiian cultural artifacts from Hawaii.
- Anglosphere
  - Australiana, for cultural artifacts from Australia
  - Canadiana, for cultural artifacts from Canada
  - Kiwiana, for cultural artifacts from New Zealand

== See also ==
- American studies – Interdisciplinary academic field
- Black Americana
- Canadiana – Class of books of and about Canadian topics
- Culture of the United States
- Folklore of the United States
- History of the United States
- Romanticism#United States – Artistic and intellectual movement
- Transcendentalism – 19th century US philosophical movement
