= Yellow After the Rain =

1971 Marimba Solo

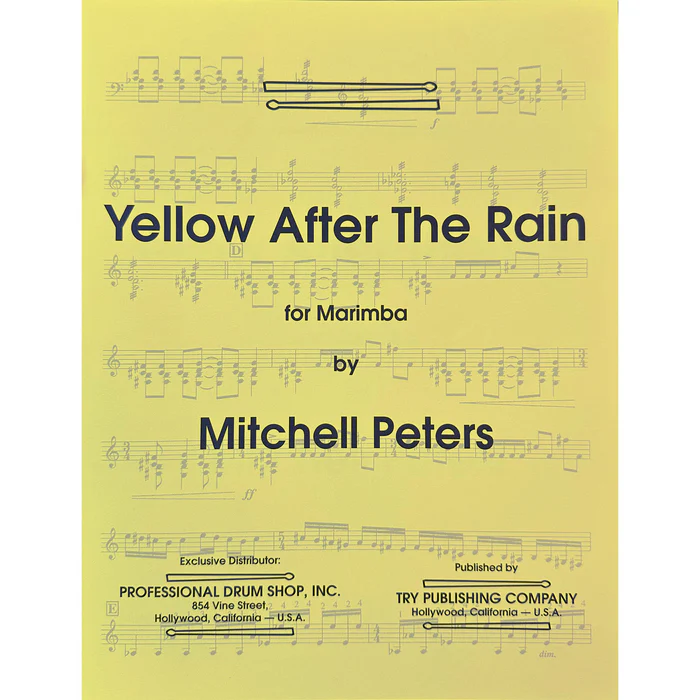

"Yellow After the Rain" is a composition for solo marimba, written in 1971 by former Los Angeles Philharmonic principal percussionist Mitchell Peters. Peters reportedly wrote the work for his own private students, for whom he was unable to find musically interesting material that introduced four-mallet techniques.

The work continues to be one of the most frequently performed marimba pieces in American universities' undergraduate percussion auditions.
