= McSorley Hill =

Ski jumping hill in Red Wing, Minnesota, US

McSorley Hill Bush Street Ski Jump
- Location: Red Wing, Minnesota, US
- Coordinates: 44°33′38″N 92°31′19″W
- Opened: 8 February 1887

Size
- K–point: K30
- Hill record: 31.4 m (103 ft) (Norway) Torjus Hemmestveit (15 January 1893)

McSorley Hill (also: Bush Street Ski Jump) was a K30 ski jumping hill located in Red Wing, Minnesota, United States, opened in 1887.

== History ==
On 8 February 1887, a ski jumping hill owned by the Aurora Ski Club opened with a ski jumping competition often cited as first ever on US soil. Mikkjel Hemmestveit set the first ever American record at 37 feet (11.3 metres).

Two official world records in ski jumping were set on this hill. In 1891 Mikkjel Hemmestveit set a record at 102 feet (31.1 metres) and two years later was improved by Torjus Hemmestveit to 102.5 feet (31.4 metres).

On 17 February 1894, Torjus Hemmestveit made a world record distance jump at 120 feet (36.6 metres), but he fell and it didn't count as a record.

== Ski jumping world records ==
No.	Date	Name	Country	Metres	Feet
#6	9 March 1891	Mikkjel Hemmestveit	Norway	31.1	102
#7	15 January 1893	Torjus Hemmestveit	Norway	31.4	103
F	17 February 1894	Torjus Hemmestveit	Norway	36.6	120

Not recognized! Crash at world record distance.
