= Mickler's Floridiana =

Mickler's Floridiana was a bookseller in Florida started by Thomas Mickler and Georgine Mickler who also ran Mickler House, a small publisher, from their Chuluota, Florida, home. They had the largest collection of books on Florida subjects (Floridiana). Some of Mickler's sermon collection now resides at the University of Central Florida Library as the "Thomas and Georgine Mickler Sermon Collection 1880-1933." Thomas Mickler was also an avid map collector. His collection spanned from 1735 to 1995, and covered lands and waterways beyond Florida, as well as providing a historical record of Florida's development.

Georgine Mickler was born in Chicago to George Rumrill, a potter in the 1920s. She was a photo illustrator in New York City and her work included photographs Jacqueline Bouvier (Jackie Kennedy). She moved to Florida in 1961. Thomas Mickler had a camera store in Orlando where the two met and fell in love. She established a part of the store for books and it grew. In 1963 the couple moved to Chuluota and set up shop in their home, the Florida Breeze, built by one of Henry Flagler's Florida East Coast Railroad agents in 1913. Its 11 rooms were eventually filled with books. Gov. Lawton Chiles visited. They also helped build St. Joseph's Catholic Church (Alafaya Trail).

The Mickler's did mail-order business as Mickler's Antiquarian Books for almost 40 years. They were skilled in obtaining out-of-print publications about Florida and collected more than 40,000 books and other historical pieces of paper memorabilia and ephemera.

Thomas Mickler was a native Floridian. He died in 1997. Georgine Mickler died in 1998. Mickler's Floridiana was purchased by Waterview Press of Oviedo, Florida, in 1999. When the estate was split up, six university libraries including Rollins College, across the state of Florida purchased materials, with University of Central Florida and the University of Florida obtaining the bulk of the collection. T. Allan Smith, from St. Petersburg, bought what remained of the couple's personal collection.

== Florida Breezes home ==
The Mickler home, known as Florida Breezes, is located at 691 Lake Drive on the south side of Lake Drive between Tropical Avenue and Fifth Street. It was constructed in 1913 as a home for Charles D. Brumley, a land agent of the Atlantic Coast Line Railroad. The house is now inhabited by Christine and Arnold Patrick Mickler III (Thomas and Georgine's nephew and actor).
