= James Touchi-Peters =

American jazz musician

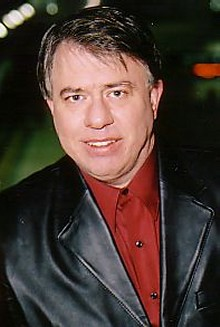
Portrait of James Touchi-Peters

James Touchi-Peters is an American composer, symphonic conductor, lyricist, pianist, jazz vocalist and record producer. A former child-prodigy orchestra conductor, he has been a frequent guest-conductor of symphony orchestras in the United States, Canada and Europe; and served for nine years as the principal conductor of the Minnesota Philharmonic Orchestra in Minneapolis, from 1992 through 2001. Under the name Touchi (pronounced "TOO-shee") he also performs as a jazz singer and composer, and his first jazz vocal album, Nights in Manhattan, was released by Logan Park Records on July 16, 2013.

Touchi-Peters was also the founder of the now-defunct Netropolitan Club, an online social network for the highly accomplished that received worldwide media attention when it launched in the fall of 2014; it folded after three months.

== Early life and career ==
Touchi-Peters is a first-generation American, born to a Romanian mother and an Albanian father. He was born and raised in Red Wing, Minnesota, where his father owned a soda fountain and candy store. His unusual hyphenated surname is from birth and not marriage, stemming from a bureaucratic error made at Ellis Island when his father emigrated to the United States. His father changed it to Peters through common usage; Touchi-Peters claims he did not know of his full legal surname until he was thirteen years old.

He showed prodigious musical ability as a child, as both a pianist and a cellist. When he was twelve, a middle-school music teacher invited him to conduct the school orchestra; not only was he physically a natural, but both Touchi-Peters and the instructor realized he could read an orchestra score without ever being shown how. He spent the following summer in Europe studying conducting with Vanco Cavdarski, music director of the Macedonian Philharmonic Orchestra, where his uncle was the principal trombonist. At sixteen he was hired as music director of the adult civic orchestra in his hometown; and at 18 he conducted the St. Paul Chamber Orchestra. By the age of twenty he had performed all the Beethoven symphonies from memory.

Touchi-Peters attended the University of Miami School of Music specifically to study conducting with Frederick Fennell, who had previously mentored his cousin, percussionist Mitchell Peters. He tested out of almost the entirety of the school's music theory program, needing to take only the two most advanced classes to complete the curriculum, which he did in one year. He studied composition there with Alfred Reed and shared a stand in the double-bass section of the university orchestra with Will Lee. He served as Fennell's personal assistant and subsequently was appointed Assistant Conductor of the University of Miami Symphony. He left the school after two years when Fennell told him they had nothing left to teach him.

He immediately signed a contract with the New York concert management firm Albert Kay Associates; at 21, this made him the youngest conductor in the world under major New York management. At 22 he was appointed Associate Music Director of Canada's Thunder Bay Symphony; this appointment made him the youngest conductor in the world working with a legitimate professional orchestra. That same year he was the youngest of a galaxy of prominent conductors that were named "Koussevitzky's Heirs" by High Fidelity Magazine.

Touchi-Peters left the Thunder Bay Symphony after only one season: "I suddenly realized I was going to spend the rest of my life conducting the same two-hundred pieces over and over again, and that realization scared the crap out of me." He moved to Los Angeles, where he worked as a composer and record producer for several years. To support himself in lean times he began spinning dance records in LA nightclubs (he lied about his experience to get his first job), and eventually became quite well-known and in demand locally as a deejay. Touchi-Peters claims that he is the only legitimate symphony conductor in the world who has also worked as a professional nightclub discjockey.

== Minnesota Philharmonic appointment and controversy ==
In January 1992, a friend in Minneapolis put Touchi-Peters in touch with the Minnesota Philharmonic Orchestra, which needed an interim conductor while they searched for a permanent replacement. The Minnesota Philharmonic was the first, and at that time the only, symphony orchestra in the United States formally chartered to represent the gay/lesbian community; and Touchi-Peters, who is not gay, was told that he would not be considered for the permanent position for that reason. He accepted the interim appointment under those conditions.

However, the musical chemistry between the new interim conductor and the orchestra was immediate and undeniable; and several of the MPO players began pushing the orchestra management to allow Touchi-Peters to apply for the permanent job. After much pressure from the musicians, the board of the orchestra changed the organization's charter so that orchestra personnel did not necessarily have to be gay, but rather must be merely "supportive of the mission of the gay community". (This change also helped the organization answer some charges of reverse discrimination that were being leveled at it by outsiders.) Under these new rules, Touchi-Peters was invited to apply for the permanent position of Principal Conductor and was hired.

His appointment was not without controversy. Three musicians quit the orchestra in protest; and there was an uproar in the local Twin Cities gay community press concerning why "America's only gay orchestra" could not find a gay conductor suitably qualified to lead it. However, most of those qualms were put to rest once Touchi-Peters began performing with the ensemble. His nine-year tenure with the Minnesota Philharmonic was marked by almost universally-positive reviews from music critics and consistently sold-out performances, and the programs became known for his insightful and often humorous narrations from the stage. (Curt Oliver of Gaze Magazine wrote, "Throughout the evening, Touchi-Peters served as program host as well as conductor. He's good at this, too! ...wonderfully witty opening remarks... He is a musician's musician and a wonderful conductor, whose energy and personality beam out to players and listeners.") When he stepped down in September 2001, the orchestra appointed him to the honorary position of Conductor Emeritus for life.

== Compositions and Songwriting ==
Touchi-Peters completed his first composition for orchestra, a symphonic arrangement of the Beatles' "Hey Jude", at age 13. As a serious composer he has written three symphonies (the first, subtitled "Disco Symphony", is based on popular American dance music from the 1970s), numerous orchestra concerti and several pieces for concert band. He has been writing songs since a teenager and currently has amassed over 300 in his catalog, including lyrics.

Touchi-Peters claims that for years, after singing on song demos for other artists, music producers and industry executives were constantly suggesting that he should record his own songs himself - suggestions he discounted until the afternoon of October 10, 2008, when he claims that, while on the deck of a cruise ship in the harbor at Cozumel, Mexico, God appeared before him and told him to perform his own songs on an album. Production on the album Nights in Manhattan began shortly thereafter. Inspired by the defining concept albums Frank Sinatra recorded with Nelson Riddle in the 1950s, on the album Touchi-Peters is accompanied by his jazz quartet (himself on piano, Kim Caine on sax, Michael Higgs on drums and Paul Liebenow on bass) and a string orchestra (which he arranged and conducted). Sam Chapman of SinatraBlog.com wrote, "Nights in Manhattan may be the best 'new standards' vocal album I've heard in years." Recording under the moniker Touchi, that album was released in July 2013. According to his record company, Nights in Manhattan makes Touchi-Peters the first established orchestra conductor in music history to sing on and produce a legitimate pop album.

== Netropolitan Club ==
On September 16, 2014, Touchi-Peters unveiled the Netropolitan Club, an exclusive online social network which he created, according to its former sales website, for "affluent and accomplished individuals worldwide to associate in a private and secure manner." In interviews Touchi-Peters claimed he created the service because, due to the unusual professional demands on his life, he "had trouble finding people to whom he could relate on other social sites," and one of the primary distinguishing features of the service was that it was possibly the first online social network to charge a relatively substantial fee for membership - $9,000 in initiation fees to join, plus $3,000 yearly thereafter.

The service immediately received major international attention from both traditional and social media, with CNN, the Los Angeles Times and other news outlets dubbing it "Facebook for rich people" and Jimmy Fallon devoting a comedic bit to it on "The Tonight Show", complete with fake screen shots. Many participants in social media considered it a crass example of flagrant income inequality.

In a December 17, 2014 article in USA Today, Touchi-Peters announced that the Netropolitan Club failed as a business and had closed.

== Personal ==
Touchi-Peters is the cousin of the late Mitchell Peters, percussion composer and former long-time timpanist with the Los Angeles Philharmonic Orchestra; and the nephew of Djoko Popovic, late principal trombonist of the Macedonian Philharmonic Orchestra of the former Yugoslavia. He is one of only two non-gay persons ever to serve as grand marshal of the Twin Cities Gay Pride Parade (the other being television news anchor Robyne Robinson). He has devoted considerable time and effort to the issue of animal rights, and he served as celebrity host and emcee of the annual black-tie fundraising gala for the Twin Cities Animal Humane Society every year of his tenure with the Minnesota Philharmonic. He currently lives in Minneapolis.
