= Belle Kogan =

Russian-American industrial designer

- Born: June 26, 1902; Ilyashevka, Russia
- Died: 2000 (aged 97–98)
- Occupation: Industrial Designer

Belle Kogan (1902–2000) was a Russian-American industrial designer and is regarded as the first prominent female in the profession in the United States (Godmother of Industrial Design) as well as one of the founders of the profession itself. In 1994, she was recognized as a fellow of both the Industrial Designers Society of America (IDSA) and Industrial Designers Institute (IDI).

== Early life and education ==
Kogan was born in Ilyashevka, Russia, on June 26, 1902, and emigrated to Allentown, Pennsylvania, in 1906. From an early age, she showed an interest in art. Regarding her senior year of high school, Kogan says, "...an unexplained inspiration on the part of my high school art teacher induced her to have me study Mechanical Drawing." Kogan was the only girl in the class. She graduated from Bethlehem High School with an art scholarship to Pennsylvania Academy of Fine Art. However, after graduating, she opted to go to Pratt Institute in Brooklyn instead, while teaching the class on mechanical drawing to fund herself.

In 1920, she was forced to leave while in her first semester at Pratt to manage her father's jewelry store. During this time, she also attended the Art Students League in Manhattan.

== Career ==
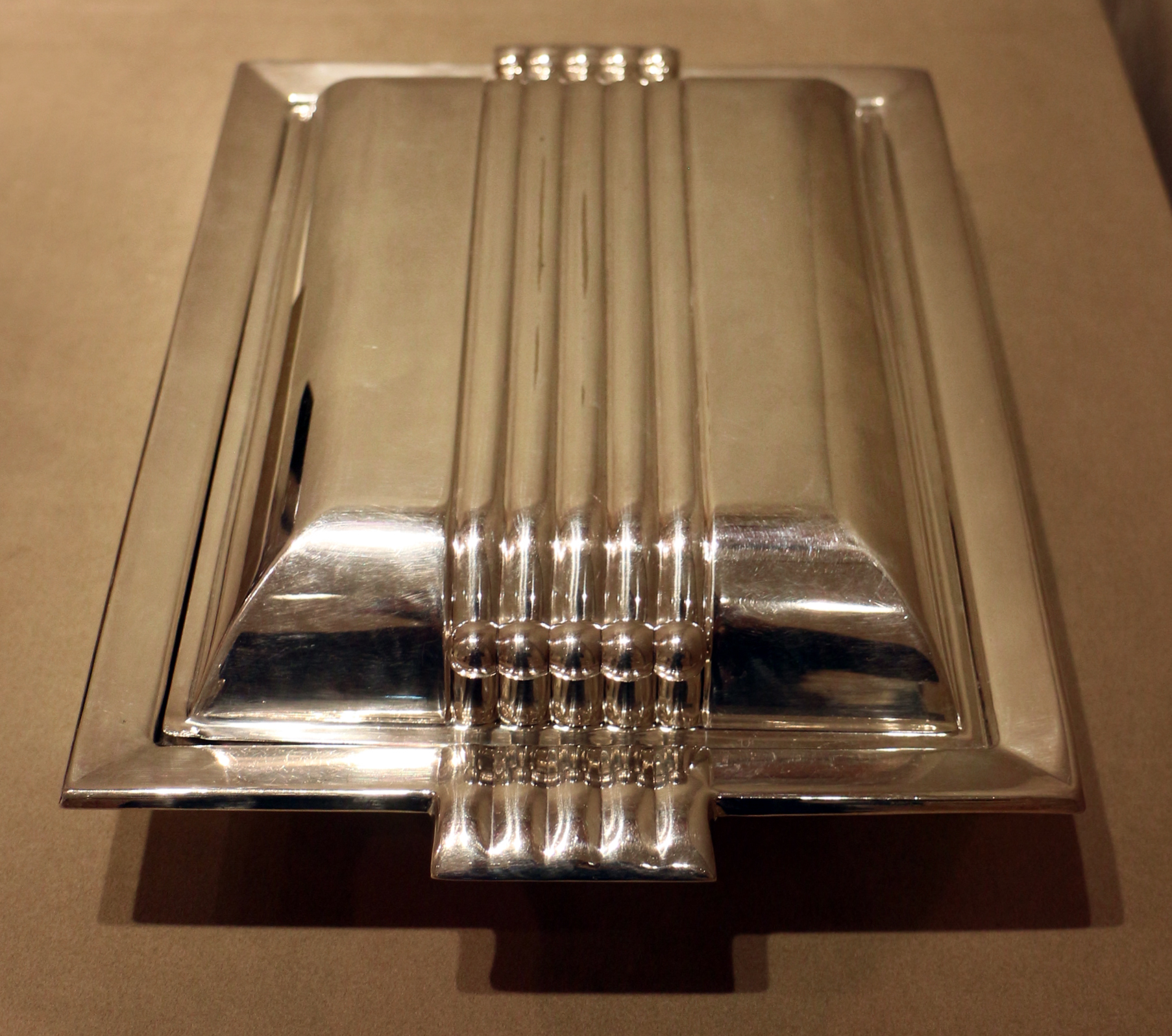
Belle Kogan for Reed & Barton, double tray, in silverplate, 1936

In 1929 she turned to design and began her first work for the Karolith Corporation.

In 1929, she was employed by the Quaker Silver Company, which trained her as a silver designer at Rhode Island School of Design and the Germany Art School in Pforzheim. In the summer of 1929, Quaker paid for Kogan to take a course at New York University that according to Kogan:

opened my eyes to the fact that design didn't just happen. It had to be developed. I felt that it was wonderful, like a puzzle, all the parts fitted in: the business training, painting, color study, and my interest in mechanics, machinery and production problems.

She was employed by the Quaker Silver Co. in late 1929 through early 1930, before leaving for Kunstgewerbe Shule Germany where she took art classes.

In July 1932, she opened her own design studio, Belle Kogan Associates (BKA), at 185 Madison Avenue in New York City with a retainer from Quaker and started designing houseware products for Bausch & Lomb, Bakelite Corp, Dow Chemical Company, Federal Glass, Haviland & Co., Libbey Glass, Maryland Plastics, Red Wing Pottery, Reed & Barton, Towle Manufacturing Co., and US Glass. Belle also was hired to make designs for Zippo Manufacturing in 1938. Five years later, she traveled throughout Europe to study trends in Scandinavian design and by 1939 found herself at the forefront of modern design in the United States.

She was one of the first industrial designers to experiment with plastics. Her early experimentation included celluloid toilet sets and clocks, a chrome-plated toaster with a plastic base, and Bakelite jewelry. She said:

In plastics the manufacturer has a material with tremendous possibilities. It is still in the active process of growth and development, but is rapidly gaining its stride. It is a material which no manufacturer, if he be alert and watchful of his competition, can afford to overlook. Radios, clocks, dishes, jewelry—all being developed in plastics today—have enormous significance.

Kogan believed that "good design should keep the consumer happy and the manufacturer in the black." In an interview Kogan said, "Today there is probably no one group more keenly alive to the caprices and demands of the buying public as industrial designers. The designer's viewpoint, therefore, is a valuable one from the basis of manufacture as well as from the basis of merchandising and selling. It is a broad conception of the consumers' desire."

Kogan also provided designs for Ebeling & Reiss, Federal Glass Co., Red Wing Pottery and Reed & Barton. She designed melamine dinnerware for the Boonton Modelling Co. where she worked for a number of years. She employed a full-time staff a staff of three women designers by 1939. Kogan was the focus of the 1946 one-woman show at the Philadelphia Art Alliance. By this time, she was considered to be the 'only woman freelance silverware designer'. Belle Kogan would continue to produce designs in America until 1970.

== Context ==
Women had little or no place in the workshop or factory before the 1860s. "Their entry into design education and practice coincided with their emergence as patrons, clients and customers at the turn of the century." Social-cultural anthropologist Arjun Appadurai comments that "...women are forced to enter the labor force in new ways on the one hand, and continue the maintenance of familial heritage on the other." Kogan chose a career saying,

I said to my father, ‘Well, I'm going to have a career, goodbye....I am never going to get married, and I'm never going to have children. I had a family all my life I helped raied. I helped you in business. I want a life of my own.

By the end of World War I, women had begun to enter the world of design. The entry was not always welcome though. In a 1939 interview, Kogan said "manufacturers were quite antagonistic when a woman came around proposing new ideas–they didn't think a woman knew enough about the mechanical aspects of the situation." On one occasion,

[a] large company that manufactured large electrical appliances...wrote in answer to a letter of mine that I should come out to see them on my next trip to Ohio. They ignored the fact that my name was ‘Belle’ and addressed their letter to Mr. Bell Kogan. When I arrived, the shock was unbelievable: the engineers decided they couldn't work with a woman. So I collected my fee of $200 plus expenses and left.

Women designers took a practical approach to the design of housewares. Kogan was very much at the forefront of this. She remarked that

the thing which needs most to be understood by the manufacturer—particularly at this stage of our commercial development—is that the sale of any product is greatly determined by the reaction of the feminine consumer...Thirty million women—all potential customers—constituting practically the entire buing structure of the nation—comprise a force which cannot or should not be disregarded. The tastes of the American woman, her reaction to color and form, are of vital importance to the manufacturer.

Continuing Kogan said,

The women of today those who belong to the middle classes (and these are the women who comprise the greatest group of consumers) want attractive things, things which are smart and things which are new. They are still interested in keeping up with the ‘Joneses.’ Items, to be readily acceptable, cannot, however, be too extreme in design. Such items do not fit into the average home, decorated as it is, with objects which are not too modern or severe in color or form.

== Impact ==
Industrial design emerges as a distinct profession in the United States in the late 1920s. Competition between companies created by the Depression led companies to focus on visual form to increase sales. This placed increasing emphasis on the in-house industrial designer as a key component of industrial production. Men such as Raymond Loewy, Walter Dorwin Teague, and Norman Bel Geddes began heading their own firms. Belle Kogan became the only woman of the time to do the same. Throughout her career she had a wide range of notable clients including Reed and Barton, Red Wing Pottery, Bausch and Lomb, Boonton Molding, Libbey Glass, and Dow Chemical. She spoke on television and radio, gave lectures and interviews, wrote and exhibited her work frequently. In the late 1930s, she was one of the founding members of the New York chapter of the American Designers Institute (ADI), which later evolved into the Industrial Designers Institute (IDI) and then the Industrial Designers Society of America (IDSA). She received the Personal Recognition Award in 1994 from the Industrial Designers Society of America.
