= KWNG =

- Red Wing, Minnesota; United States
- Frequency: 105.9 MHz
- Branding: K-Wing 106

Programming
- Format: Classic hits
- Affiliations: Minnesota Twins; Fox News Radio

Ownership
- Owner: Q Media Group, LLC
- Sister stations: KCUE, KLCH, WPVW

History
- First air date: 1965 (as KCUE-FM)
- Former call signs: KCUE-FM (1965–1981)
- Former frequencies: 105.5 MHz
- Call sign meaning: K-WiNG 106

Technical information
- Licensing authority: FCC
- Facility ID: 60864
- Class: C3
- ERP: 12,000 watts
- HAAT: 100 meters
- Transmitter coordinates: 44.537°N 92.523°W

Links
- Public license information: Public file; LMS
- Webcast: Listen Live
- Website: kwng.com

KWNG (105.9 FM) is a classic hits radio station in Red Wing, Minnesota, and is owned by Q Media Group, LLC. They are also the local affiliate station in the Red Wing area for the MLB's Minnesota Twins for all 162 regular season & playoff games. The station is also the home of Goodhue High School athletics.

== History ==
KWNG traces its history to KCUE-FM, an FM station in Red Wing. In December 1964, Broadcasting reported that the FCC had assigned the KCUE-FM call letters to Hiawatha Valley Public Service Broadcasters Inc. for a Red Wing FM station. FCC action notices published in 1965 show the station still moving through the construction-permit process. In April 1965, the permit was modified to change antenna type, and later that year the completion date was extended first to August 26 and then to October 26, 1965.

The station originally operated on 105.5 MHz. A 1967 SAMS Stereo FM listing included KCUE-FM in Red Wing on 105.5 MHz, and a later Minnesota Broadcasters Association directory identified KWNG-FM's previous call letters or frequency as "KCUE-FM/105.5".

In late 1974, the FCC granted KCUE-FM a construction-permit change under file number BPH-9223. The station was authorized to begin program operation from the changed facilities on December 23, 1974.

The station later changed its call sign to KWNG and moved from 105.5 to 105.9 MHz. A March 1982 DX publication listed "KWNG 105.5 Red Wing" and noted that the station was still identifying on the hour as KCUE-FM. The 1984 edition of the FM Atlas also listed KWNG at 105.5 MHz in Red Wing. The Minnesota Broadcasters Association directory later listed KWNG-FM at 105.9 MHz, gave its previous call letters or frequency as "KCUE-FM/105.5", and identified the owner as Sorenson Broadcasting Corp., headed by Dean Sorenson. The same listing described the station's format as classic rock, with AP wire service, 3,000 watts, a 300-foot antenna height, and studios at 113 Guernsey Lane in Red Wing.

By 2002, Sorenson Broadcasting still owned KCUE and KWNG, but NorthPine reported that Waitt Radio was operating the Red Wing stations under a local marketing agreement. In March 2010, NorthPine reported that Alan Quarnstrom's Q Media Group, LLC was exercising an option to buy KCUE and KWNG from Sorenson Broadcasting for $1.55 million, and that Q Media had operated the stations under a local programming and marketing agreement since 2007. The FCC accepted the KWNG assignment application on March 9, 2010, and granted the voluntary assignment of KWNG's license from Sorenson Broadcasting Corp. to Q Media Group LLC on April 22, 2010.

The FCC public inspection file currently lists KWNG as a licensed commercial FM station on 105.9 MHz, RF channel 290, facility ID 60864, licensed to Red Wing, Minnesota, with Q Media Group LLC as licensee. Visit Red Wing describes the station's programming as "greatest hits from the 70’s – 2000’s" and lists KWNG as a Minnesota Twins radio affiliate and supporter of local and high-school athletics. The Minnesota Twins' official Treasure Island Baseball Network affiliate list also identifies Red Wing's affiliate as KWNG-FM 105.9.
