= Mitchell Peters =

- Born: Mitchell Thomas Peters; August 17, 1935; Red Wing, Minnesota, U.S.
- Died: October 28, 2017 (aged 82) Encinitas, California, U.S.
- Genres: Classical
- Occupations: Musician, composer, music teacher
- Instruments: Timpani, percussion
- Years active: 1958–2012

Mitchell Thomas Peters (August 17, 1935 – October 28, 2017) was a principal timpanist and percussionist with the Los Angeles Philharmonic Orchestra. He composed well-known pieces for the marimba such as "Yellow After the Rain" and "Sea Refractions"; it is said that these works were composed because Peters felt that there was a lack of musically interesting material that would introduce his students to four-mallet marimba techniques.

== Biography ==
Peters began his career in the United States Army Symphony Orchestra. He later was principal percussionist of the Dallas Symphony before taking the principal percussion position in the Los Angeles Philharmonic in 1969. When principal timpanist William Kraft retired in 1981 to pursue his career as a composer, Peters stepped up to assume the role as timpanist, a position he occupied through the Los Angeles Philharmonic's 2005/2006 season. Peters was well known for his prodigious sight reading ability.

Peters became the applied percussion teacher at California State University Los Angeles shortly after joining the LA Philharmonic. During his tenure as timpanist, he took the position as professor of percussion at the University of California, Los Angeles. In May 2012, Peters retired from teaching.

Peters was also a member of the Philharmonic New Music Group and recorded a wide array of contemporary works as a chamber musician. Peters held the Performer's Certificate and bachelor's and master's degrees from the Eastman School of Music, where he studied with William Street. While at Eastman, he was a member of the original "Marimba Masters." Upon graduation, he served as timpanist with the 7th U.S. Army Symphony Orchestra. As a widely published author and composer, Peter's works and instructional materials are highly regarded throughout the United States and abroad. He owned and operated a music publishing company that handled percussion works exclusively. His faculty positions included the Music Academy of the West in Montecito from 1990 to 2002, and UCLA, where he taught percussion and conducted the percussion ensemble. In 2006 he was awarded a Lifetime Achievement Award from the Sabian Cymbal Company.

After a year of declining health, Peters died on October 28, 2017, at the age of 82. In a newspaper article announcing his death, symphonic conductor James Touchi-Peters- who was also Peters' cousin- was quoted as saying, "It's not an exaggeration to say that Mitch Peters was among the dozen best timpanists in the world." In a letter to Peters, the late conductor and percussionist Frederick Fennell wrote, "I may make music long enough to run into a better percussionist than you, but I doubt it very much."

== Compositions ==
=== Solo works ===
==== Trombone ====
- Rondo for Solo Trombone (pub. 1972)

==== Marimba ====
- Sonata-Allegro, marimba and piano (pub. 1968) [Grade 3+]
- Chant, marimba (2 mallets) (pub. 1971) [Grade 3]
- Sea Refractions, marimba (4 mallets) (pub. 1971) [Grade 3]
- Theme and Variations, marimba (2–4 mallets) and piano (pub. c. 1971) [Grade 4]
- Yellow After the Rain, marimba (4 mallets) (pub. 1971) [Grade 4+]
- Zen Wanderer, marimba (4 mallets) (pub. 1972) [Grade 3]
- Teardrops, marimba (4 mallets) (pub. 1975) [Grade 3]
- Undercurrent, marimba (4 mallets) (pub. 1975) [Grade 3]
- Waves, marimba (4 mallets) (pub. 1975) [Grade 3]
- Three Pieces for Three Mallets, marimba (3 mallets) (pub. 1978) [Grade 3]
- Dog Beach, marimba (4 mallets) (pub. 1999) [Grade 3]
- Galactica, marimba (2 mallet) (pub. 1999) [Grade 3+]
- Pastiche, marimba (4 mallets) (pub. 1999) [Grade 3]
- Starscape, marimba (4 mallets) (pub. 1999) [Grade 3]
- Barcelona, marimba (4 mallets) (pub. 2000) [Grade 3]

==== Timpani ====
- Scherzo for Three Timpani (1 player) (pub. 1968) [Grade 3]
- Rondino, 4 timpani (1 player) (pub. 1970) [Grade 3]
- Tribal Serenade, 4 timpani (1 player) (pub. 1971) [Grade 3]
- The Storm (Silence is Golden), 4 timpani (1 player) (pub. 1975) [Grade 4]
- Primal Mood, 4 timpani (1 player) (pub. 1972) [Grade 3]

==== Multi-percussion ====
- Etude #I, 4 tom-toms (1 player) (pub. 1967) [Grade 3]
- Rondo, tom-tom solo (4 tom-toms) (1 player) (pub. 1968) [Grade 3]
- Passacaglia and Trio, multiple percussion solo (1 player) (pub. 1971) [Grade 3]
- Perpetual Motion, snare drum and 4 tom-toms (1 player) (pub. 1971) [Grade 3]

=== Percussion ensemble ===
- March of the Eagles, 5 percussionists (pub. 1967)
- A la nañigo, percussion ensemble (5 players) (pub. 1967)
- Study in 5/8, percussion quartet (pub. 1967) [Grade 3]
- A la samba, 6 percussionists (pub. 1969) [Grade 3+]
- Piece for Percussion (4 players)(pub March 27, 1969)

=== Method book ===
- Odd Meter Rudimental Etudes, snare drum, educational work (pub. 1967)
- Stick Control for the Drum Set, Volume 1: Basic Triplet Patterns, educational work (pub. 1967)
- Etude #II, (1 player) (pub. 1968) [Grade 3]
- Introduction and Waltz, (1 player) (pub. 1968) [Grade 2]
- Developing Dexterity for Snare Drum, educational work (pub. 1968)
- Drum Music to March By, educational work (pub. 1968)
- Stick Control for the Drum Set, Volume 2: Basic Sixteenth Patterns, educational work (pub. 1969)
- Advanced Snare Drum Studies, educational work (pub. 1971)
- Odd Meter Calisthenics for the Snare Drummer, educational work (pub. 1973)
- Intermediate Snare Drum Studies (43 studies), educational work (pub. 1976)
- Intermediate Timpani Studies, educational work (pub. 1981)
- Hard Times: 20 advanced etudes for snare drum, educational work (pub. 1984)
- Elementary Snare Drum Studies, educational work (pub. 1988)
- Rudimental Primer for the Snare Drummer, educational work (pub. 1990)
- Fundamental Method for Timpani, educational work (pub. by Alfred, 1993)
- Fundamental Method for Mallets, educational work (pub. by Alfred, 1995)
- Fundamental Method for Mallets, Book 2, educational work (pub. by Alfred, 1996)
- Fundamental Solos for Timpani: 15 intermediate-level solos for the developing timpanist, educational work (pub. by Alfred, 1997)
- Fundamental Solos for Mallets, educational work (1999)
- Etudes for Snare Drum, educational work (pub. 2003) [Advanced]
