= George Rumrill =

George Rumrill was an American potter. He started RumRill Pottery. His work was popular in the 1920s. Georgine Mickler was his daughter. After her mother died she was raised by an aunt.

Rumrill was an art pottery designer and salesman. RumRill Pottery was made in Minnesota and Ohio (Minnesota from 1931 to 1938 and in Ohio from 1938 to 1942).

Rumrill, like many potters of the era, developed breathing issues from the clay dust. He died in 1943.

== RumRill Art pottery by Red Wing ==
RumRill Art pottery was made by Red Wing Pottery from 1933 to 1937. George Rumrill contracted with Red Wing to make his art pottery. RumRill shapes were numbered from 50 to 677.)

From 1938 to 1941 RumRill pottery was made in Ohio and possibly by Shawnee Pottery, and Gondor Pottery)
