= Minnesota Philharmonic Orchestra =

American orchestra

The Minnesota Philharmonic Orchestra (MPO; formerly the Minnesota Philharmonia) is an American orchestra. It was the first orchestra in the United States to represent and serve the LGBTQ community. Founded in 1992 by Kevin Ford, it is headquartered in Minneapolis and primarily performs at the O'Shaughnessy Auditorium in St. Paul. Its current artistic director and principal conductor is Brian Edward Dowdy.

== History ==
Diagnosed with HIV/AIDS in 1991, Minneapolis cellist Kevin Ford began thinking about leaving a legacy to the Twin Cities gay community. Enlisting the help of two other local musicians, Tim Perry and Corwyn Knutson from the St. Paul Civic Symphony, Ford began placing calls to members of the gay communities in other major U.S. cities, inquiring on if and how they might have started their local gay orchestra. To his astonishment, he quickly discovered that there were no other gay orchestras in any city in the U.S.

In late 1992, Ford placed ads in local Twin Cities gay publications, calling for musicians interested in forming a local gay/lesbian orchestra to come to an informational meeting. About forty local musicians showed up, enough to prove to Ford that the concept was viable. Ford approached William T. Jones, the founder and former conductor of the Greater Twin Cities Youth Symphonies, about serving as conductor of the ensemble. Jones declined the position, but he said he would conduct the first rehearsal of the new orchestra to get the group started. The first rehearsal of the newly named Minnesota Philharmonia took place in January 1993, with Jones conducting.

That rehearsal was deemed successful by most everyone involved, but left the group scrambling to find an interim conductor until a formal search could be made. Ford remembered James Touchi-Peters, a 27-year-old former child-prodigy who had guest-conducted an orchestra he played in several years earlier. A call was made to Touchi-Peters, who lived in Los Angeles at the time, and he agreed to come to Minneapolis to serve as interim conductor of the new ensemble until a permanent music director could be found. As Touchi-Peters was not a gay man, he was told by Ford—now chairman of the new group's board of directors—that he would not be eligible for the permanent post; and he accepted the interim job on those terms.

Touchi-Peters conducted the second rehearsal of the Minnesota Philharmonia only a week after Jones' appearance, and the group started preparing for their first public performance. Almost instantly, Touchi-Peters' chemistry with the new ensemble was undeniable to almost everyone involved; and after only a few rehearsals several of the musicians asked the orchestra's board to allow Touchi-Peters to apply for the permanent position. This put Ford and the orchestra's board in a delicate situation; board members wondered aloud about the ramifications for the gay community of having a non-gay conductor leading America's first gay orchestra.

At the same time, word had gotten out to the Twin Cities music community about the new gay ensemble, and rumblings were being heard to the effect that restricting membership of the new orchestra to only gay and lesbian persons was a form of reverse discrimination. Sensitive to this issue—and to increasing demands from the orchestra's players to consider Touchi-Peters for the permanent conducting post—the Philharmonia's board changed their new charter to also allow for musicians "supportive of the mission of the gay community". With this change, Touchi-Peters was auditioned for the permanent post and was quickly hired. (This also allowed non-gay players to join the ranks of the ensemble; since that time about ten percent of the MPO's players have been non-gay individuals.) Touchi-Peters' hiring was not without controversy, however. Three players quit the new orchestra in protest, and the local gay newspaper Equal Time ran a scathing editorial chastising "America's first gay orchestra" for hiring a non-gay conductor.

== Performances ==
The first public performance of the Minnesota Philharmonia took place in June 1993 at the auditorium of Minneapolis Community and Technical College, which sold out. When Touchi-Peters first took the stage, he said to the audience, "You have before you the very first orchestra in American musical history formed specifically to represent gay and lesbian people"; the audience responded with an immediate and prolonged standing ovation. The program for the evening was Copland's "Outdoor Overture", Haydn's Symphony No. 104 and Schubert's "Unfinished" Symphony.

Touchi-Peters conducted the orchestra for its first nine seasons, drawing consistently sold-out crowds and near-universal positive reviews from the local Twin Cities press. The programs became known for his insightful and often humorous narrations from the stage about the works performed and the composers who wrote them. Drawing on his extensive ties in the music industry, he also arranged for several world-class soloists to appear with the ensemble, including pianist Lydia Artymiw and soprano Dorothy Benham. When he stepped down in September 2001, the orchestra awarded him the lifetime honorary title of conductor emeritus.

Founder Kevin Ford, who also served as the orchestra's principal cellist, died of complications from AIDS in February 1995, only two days before a scheduled MPO concert. In his honor, the orchestra performed that concert with the first cellist's chair vacant; in his eulogy at Ford's funeral, Touchi-Peters called him "a relatively ordinary man who accomplished an extraordinary thing". Several weeks later, citing the number of players that had joined the ensemble as well as the new audience's desire to hear larger Romantic-era works, the Minnesota Philharmonia officially changed its name to the Minnesota Philharmonic Orchestra.

After Touchi-Peters' departure in 2001 the MPO did a world-wide search for a new conductor and ultimately awarded the post to Joseph Schlefke, who had served as the orchestra's assistant conductor for the previous two seasons. Under Schlefke's leadership the technical level of the ensemble's playing substantially improved, and he brought novel programming concepts to the ensemble, including dance companies sharing the stage with the orchestra and multi-media presentations accompanying the performances. He also led the orchestra in a performance of Mozart's Symphony No. 38 for broadcast on Twin Cities Public Television (PBS). Schlefke left in 2011 after ten seasons; he was replaced by Jacob Sustaita, former assistant conductor of the Houston Opera.

Jacob Sustaita remained with the MPO for three seasons, leaving to pursue other interests related to viola performance. In 2015, the MPO hired Alexander Platt as its fourth conductor.

== Legacy ==
Since its inception the MPO has prided itself on including a large amount of contemporary symphonic music on its programs, including at least one work on every program by a gay (or, in the case of historical figures, "assumed-to-be-gay") composer. The orchestra also performs for outreach and charitable causes, including the Human Rights Campaign, the local annual AIDS Walk, and the annual Twin Cities Gay Pride Celebration; and every June it performs an outdoor concert at Como Park in St. Paul in conjunction with the four other major gay/lesbian music ensembles of the Twin Cities (collectively known as the Queer Music Consortium).
