= KCUE =

- Red Wing, Minnesota; United States
- Frequency: 1250 kHz
- Branding: Bluff Country

Programming
- Format: Classic country
- Affiliations: Minnesota Vikings; Fox News Radio; Linder Farm Network

Ownership
- Owner: Q Media Group, LLC
- Sister stations: KWNG, KLCH, WPVW

History
- First air date: March 8, 1950

Technical information
- Licensing authority: FCC
- Facility ID: 60855
- Class: D
- Power: 1,000 watts day 110 watts night
- Transmitter coordinates: 44°32′14″N 92°31′21″W
- Translator: 98.9 K255CZ (Red Wing)

Links
- Public license information: Public file; LMS
- Webcast: Listen Live
- Website: KCUE Online

KCUE (1250 AM, Bluff Country) is a radio station broadcasting a classic country music format. Licensed to Red Wing, Minnesota, United States, the station is currently owned by the Q Media Group, LLC.

== Programming ==
KCUE features a Classic Country Format. It has hourly updates from Fox News Radio, programming from Linder Farm Network, local news, and weather. KCUE is an affiliate of the Minnesota Vikings radio network. It also has Red Wing High School sports, and some Red Wing Aces amateur baseball.

== History ==
KCUE first signed on the air on March 8, 1950. The station was originally owned by the Red Wing Broadcasting Company owned by George L. Brooks. It was originally a daytimer which meant it had to sign off at sunset. On July 16, 2004, the station was sold to Sorenson Broadcasting Corp. The station is currently owned by Q Media Group, LLC.

KCUE's FM counterpart signed on in 1966, and is now KWNG.

Logo before translator sign on
