= East Red Wing, Minnesota =

Coordinates: 44°33′49″N 92°30′27″W

East Red Wing is a neighborhood of the city of Red Wing in Goodhue County, Minnesota, United States.

== History ==
East Red Wing was incorporated as a village in 1857. Shortly after this, the village charter was revoked by the state; as such, the village was merged with Red Wing on March 19, 1857.
