= HMS Redwing =

Six ships of the Royal Navy have been named HMS Redwing, after the redwing. Another was renamed before being launched, and another was cancelled.

- HMS Redwing (1806) was a Cruizer-class brig-sloop, built in Brightlingsea in 1806, and lost at sea in 1827.
- HMS Redwing was to have been an 18-gun sloop. She was ordered in 1829 and cancelled in 1832.
- HMS Redwing (1837) was a wooden paddle packet, originally the GPO's Richmond. She was transferred to the Navy in 1837 and sold in 1849.
- HMS Redwing (1855) was a Dapper-class gunboat, built at Northfleet in 1855, and broken up in 1878.
- HMS Redwing (1880) was a composite screw gunboat built as HMS Espion but renamed in 1879 and launched in 1880. She was sold in 1905.
- HMS Redwing (1905) was a tender, previously the War Department's Sir Charles Pasley. She was transferred to the Navy in 1905 and was sold in 1931.
- HMS Redwing was to have been an Admiralty M-class destroyer. She was renamed HMS Medora in 1915, and finally HMS Medway in 1916, and launched that year.
- HMS Redwing (1933) was a tender launched in 1933, sold in 1957 and broken up in 1965.
