= Red Wing, Minnesota =

City in Minnesota, United States

Red Wing
- City
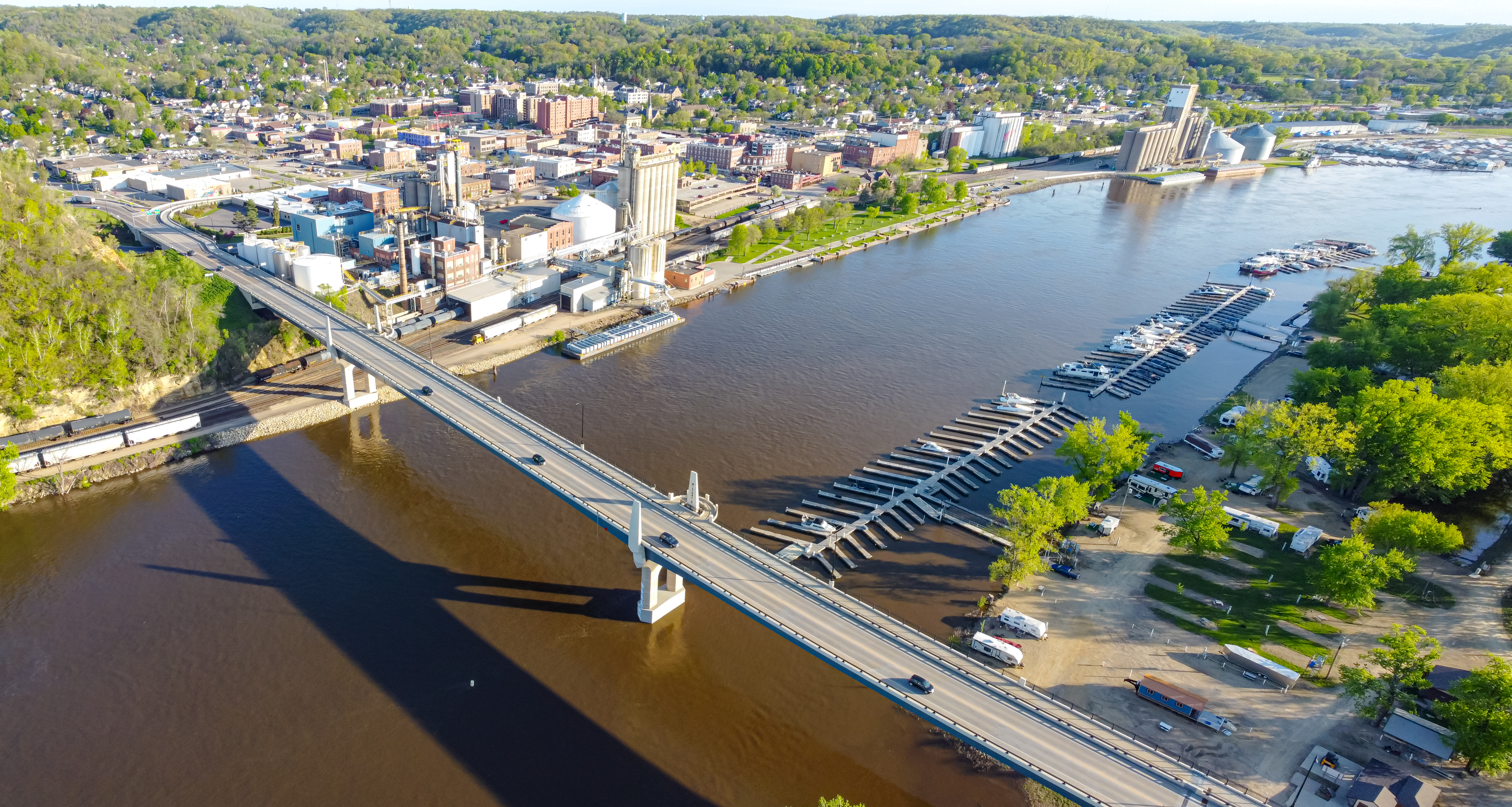
- Red Wing Bridge and Downtown Red Wing
- Motto: "Come for a visit, stay for a lifetime"
- Location of the city of Red Wing within Goodhue County in the state of Minnesota
- Coordinates: 44°34′N 92°32′W
- Country: United States
- State: Minnesota
- County: Goodhue
- Established: 1857
- Named for: Chief Red Wing

Government
  - Type: Mayor – Council
  - Mayor: Gary Iocco

Area
  - Total: 41.41 sq mi (107.26 km^{2})
  - Land: 34.83 sq mi (90.20 km^{2})
  - Water: 6.59 sq mi (17.06 km^{2})
- Elevation: 735 ft (224 m)

Population (2020)
  - Total: 16,547
  - Density: 475.1/sq mi (183.45/km^{2})
- Time zone: UTC-6 (CST)
  - Summer (DST): UTC-5 (CDT)
- ZIP Code: 55066
- Area code: 651
- FIPS code: 27-53620
- GNIS ID: 0649885
- Website: www.redwingmn.gov

Red Wing is a city in and the county seat of Goodhue County, Minnesota, United States, along the upper Mississippi River. The population was 16,547 at the 2020 census. It is part of the Minneapolis–Saint Paul metropolitan area.

The federal government established a Mdewakanton Sioux Indian reservation—now Prairie Island Indian Community—in 1936 along the Mississippi River. The city of Red Wing developed around it.

The National Trust for Historic Preservation placed Red Wing on its 2008 distinctive destinations list because of its "impressive architecture and enviable natural environment".

== History ==
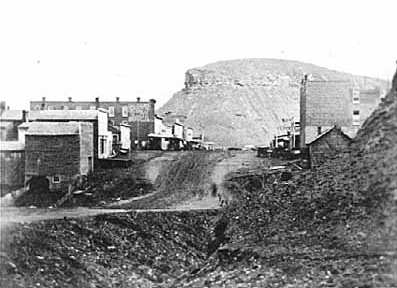
Main Street, Red Wing, 1860

In the early 1850s, settlers from Mississippi River steamboats came to Red Wing to farm in Goodhue County. They encroached on traditional territory of the Mdewakanton Sioux. Although many Mdewakanton left for the Lower Sioux Indian Reservation after the Treaty of Traverse de Sioux was ratified in May 1853, settlers burned the lodges of those who remained in April 1854.

The settlers cleared the land for wheat, the annual crop of which could pay the cost of the land. Before railroads were constructed across the territory of Goodhue County, it produced more wheat than any other county in the country. In 1873, Red Wing led the country in wheat sold by farmers. The warehouses in the port of Red Wing could store and export more than a million bushels.

Once the railroads connected southern Minnesota with Minneapolis and Saint Anthony, where the largest flour mills were built, the port at Red Wing lost prominence.

The Aurora Ski Club in Red Wing, founded on February 8, 1887, was one of the first ski clubs in North America, reflecting the skills of Scandinavian immigrants in the area. In the 1880s, Aurora club members introduced what became known as "Red Wing Style" ski techniques, patterned after the Telemark skiing form. The term "Red Wing style" remained in use in the U.S. well into the 20th century. In 1887, Norwegian immigrant Mikkjel Hemmestveit set the first North American ski jumping record, 37 feet, at the Aurora Ski Club's McSorley Hill.

In 1889, the federal government established a Mdewakanton Sioux Indian reservation along the Mississippi River to free up land for settlers. It is now within the city of Red Wing, and is known as the Prairie Island Indian Community.

Red Wing's first settlers built small mills, factories, and workshops like those they were familiar with in New England and the upper Midwest, regions from which many had come. Numerous immigrants from Germany, Ireland, Norway, and Sweden settled in this area, and may were skilled craftsmen. Some early industries were tanning and shoe-making, while other businesses manufactured farm equipment, bricks, barrels, boats, furniture, pottery, and clothing buttons. Consumables included beer and lumber. Service industries including stone-cutting, hospitality, and retailing. The St. James Hotel remains a working token of the earlier time.

Red Wing was once home to Hamline University, founded in 1854 as Minnesota's first institution of higher education. It closed in 1869 because of low enrollment due to diversion of students to the American Civil War. Chartered in St. Paul in 1871, it reopened there in 1880.

Red Wing Seminary was a Lutheran Church seminary, founded in 1879. It was the educational center for Hauge's Norwegian Evangelical Lutheran Synod in America, commonly known as the Hauge Synod. Red Wing Seminary operated until 1917.

Red Wing also was the home of Minnesota Elementarskola, a Swedish elementary school that was the predecessor to Gustavus Adolphus College, a private liberal arts college of the Evangelical Lutheran Church of America (ELCA). The school was founded in Red Wing in 1862 by Eric Norelius, moved to East Union in 1863, and then was built in St. Peter in 1873–76.

The Red Wing Pottery and stoneware industry began in 1861, when county potter John Paul discovered the large, glacially deposited clay pit beds in the northwest of the city, close to Hay Creek. The first commercial pottery company, Red Wing Stoneware, was founded in 1877. It used clay from the area of the Hay Creek headwaters, close to Goodhue, near a hamlet named Claybank. A railroad branch line was built to carry clay to Red Wing for this industry. The factory buildings remain, but only traces of the railroad, abandoned in 1937, are left.

=== 20th century to present ===
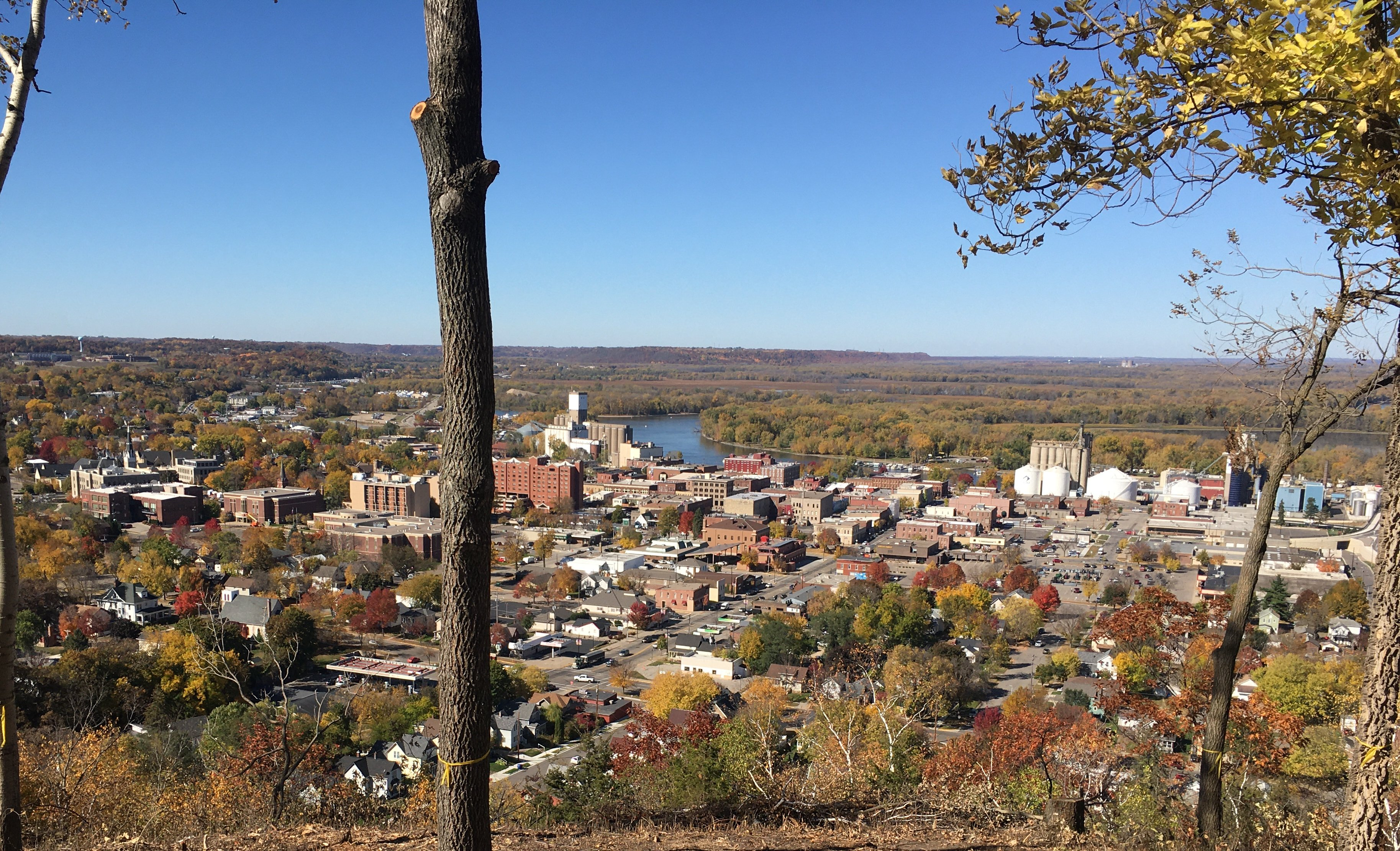
Red Wing

The Minnesota Correctional Facility – Red Wing is housed in the former Minnesota State Training School, built in 1889. Warren B. Dunnell designed the original Romanesque building. He was the architect of a number of Minnesota's public buildings. The institution was the subject of "Walls of Red Wing", a folk song by American singer-songwriter Bob Dylan.

In the last half of the 20th century, the United States Army Corps of Engineers built Lock and Dam No. 3 and deepened the channel on the Mississippi River to improve navigation in this area. Such projects have revitalized Mississippi River traffic for shipping grain and coal. The port of Red Wing has gained business as a result.

In 1973, the Prairie Island Nuclear Power Plant opened along the river. The federal government authorized the project in consultation with the Minnesota state government. Xcel Energy owns and operates the facility.

== Geography ==
According to the United States Census Bureau, the city has an area of 41.19 square miles (106.68 km^{2}), of which 34.60 square miles (89.61 km^{2}) is land and 6.59 square miles (17.07 km^{2}) is water. The city is at the northern edge of the Driftless Area of karst topography.

=== Neighborhoods ===
Red Wing has several neighborhoods or other places annexed by the city. These include:

- Burnside Township
- East Red Wing
- Eggleston

== Demographics ==
Historical population
Census	Pop.	Note	%±
1860	1,250		—
1870	4,260		240.8%
1880	5,876		37.9%
1890	6,294		7.1%
1900	7,525		19.6%
1910	9,048		20.2%
1920	8,637		−4.5%
1930	9,629		11.5%
1940	9,962		3.5%
1950	10,645		6.9%
1960	10,528		−1.1%
1970	10,441		−0.8%
1980	13,736		31.6%
1990	15,134		10.2%
2000	16,116		6.5%
2010	16,459		2.1%
2020	16,547		0.5%
U.S. Decennial Census

=== 2020 census ===
As of the 2020 census, Red Wing had a population of 16,547. The median age was 42.7 years. 21.4% of residents were under the age of 18 and 22.6% of residents were 65 years of age or older. For every 100 females there were 95.1 males, and for every 100 females age 18 and over there were 93.0 males age 18 and over.

89.6% of residents lived in urban areas, while 10.4% lived in rural areas.

There were 7,194 households in Red Wing, of which 24.8% had children under the age of 18 living in them. Of all households, 43.6% were married-couple households, 18.6% were households with a male householder and no spouse or partner present, and 29.3% were households with a female householder and no spouse or partner present. About 34.1% of all households were made up of individuals and 16.7% had someone living alone who was 65 years of age or older.

There were 7,604 housing units, of which 5.4% were vacant. The homeowner vacancy rate was 1.4% and the rental vacancy rate was 5.6%.

Racial composition as of the 2020 census
Race	Number	Percent
White	14,177	85.7%
Black or African American	490	3.0%
American Indian and Alaska Native	357	2.2%
Asian	166	1.0%
Native Hawaiian and Other Pacific Islander	16	0.1%
Some other race	454	2.7%
Two or more races	887	5.4%
Hispanic or Latino (of any race)	862	5.2%

=== 2010 census ===
As of the 2010 census, there were 16,459 people, 7,017 households, and 4,328 families residing in the city. The population density was 475.7 inhabitants per square mile (183.7/km^{2}). There were 7,539 housing units at an average density of 217.9 per square mile (84.1/km^{2}). The racial makeup of the city was 91.5% White, 1.9% African American, 2.2% Native American, 0.8% Asian, 1.2% from other races, and 2.3% from two or more races. Hispanic or Latino of any race were 3.7% of the population.

There were 7,017 households, of which 28.0% had children under the age of 18 living with them, 46.6% were married couples living together, 10.6% had a female householder with no husband present, 4.5% had a male householder with no wife present, and 38.3% were non-families. 32.2% of all households were made up of individuals, and 14.6% had someone living alone who was 65 years of age or older. The average household size was 2.27 and the average family size was 2.84.

The median age in the city was 41.8 years. 22.5% of residents were under the age of 18; 7.8% were between the ages of 18 and 24; 23.9% were from 25 to 44; 27.7% were from 45 to 64; and 18.2% were 65 years of age or older. The gender makeup of the city was 48.6% male and 51.4% female.

=== 2000 census ===
At the 2000 census, there were 16,116 people, 6,562 households, and 4,166 families in the city. The population density was 455.3 per square mile (175.8 km^{2}). There were 6,867 housing units at an average density of 194.0 per square mile (74.9/km^{2}). The ethnical makeup was 94.33% White, 1.32% African American, 2.22% Native American, 0.74% Asian, 0.05% Pacific Islander, 0.53% from other ethnicities, and 0.82% from two or more ethnicities. Hispanic or Latino of any ethnicity were 1.27% of the population.

There were 6,562 households, of which 30.4% had children under 18 with them, 51.2% were married couples living together, 8.9% had a female householder with no husband present, and 36.5% were non-families. 30.7% of all households were of individuals and 13.3% had someone living alone 65 or older. The average household size was 2.35 and the average family 2.94.

In the city, the population was 24.6% under 18, 8.2% from 18 to 24, 27.5% from 25 to 44, 23.2% from 45 to 64, and 16.5% 65 or older. The median was 39. For every 100 females, there were 93.5 males. For every 100 females 18 and over, there were 90.6 males.

The median income for a household was $43,674, and the median for a family was $54,641. Males had a median of $36,576 versus $25,477 for females. The per capita income was $21,678. About 3.9% of families and 6.8% of the population were below the poverty line, including 7.9% of those under age 18 and 8.0% of those 65 or over.

== Economy ==
Manufacturers in Red Wing include Red Wing Shoes, Riedell Skates, and Red Wing Stoneware.

== Arts and culture ==
=== Festivals ===
- Big Turn Music Fest – February
- Prairie Island Indian Community Wacipi (Pow Wow) – July
- Rolling River Music Festival – July
- River City Days – first weekend in August
- Hispanic Heritage Festival – second weekend in September
- MN Children's Book Festival – third weekend in September
- Fall Festival of the Arts – second weekend in October
- Holiday Stroll – Friday after Thanksgiving

=== Library ===
Red Wing Public Library is a member of Southeastern Libraries Cooperating.

== Parks and recreation ==
The Cannon Valley Trail's eastern terminus is in Red Wing. The nearby Prairie Island Indian Reservation operates Treasure Island Resort and Casino.

He Mni Can-Barn Bluff is a natural feature for hiking and sport climbing.

== Government ==
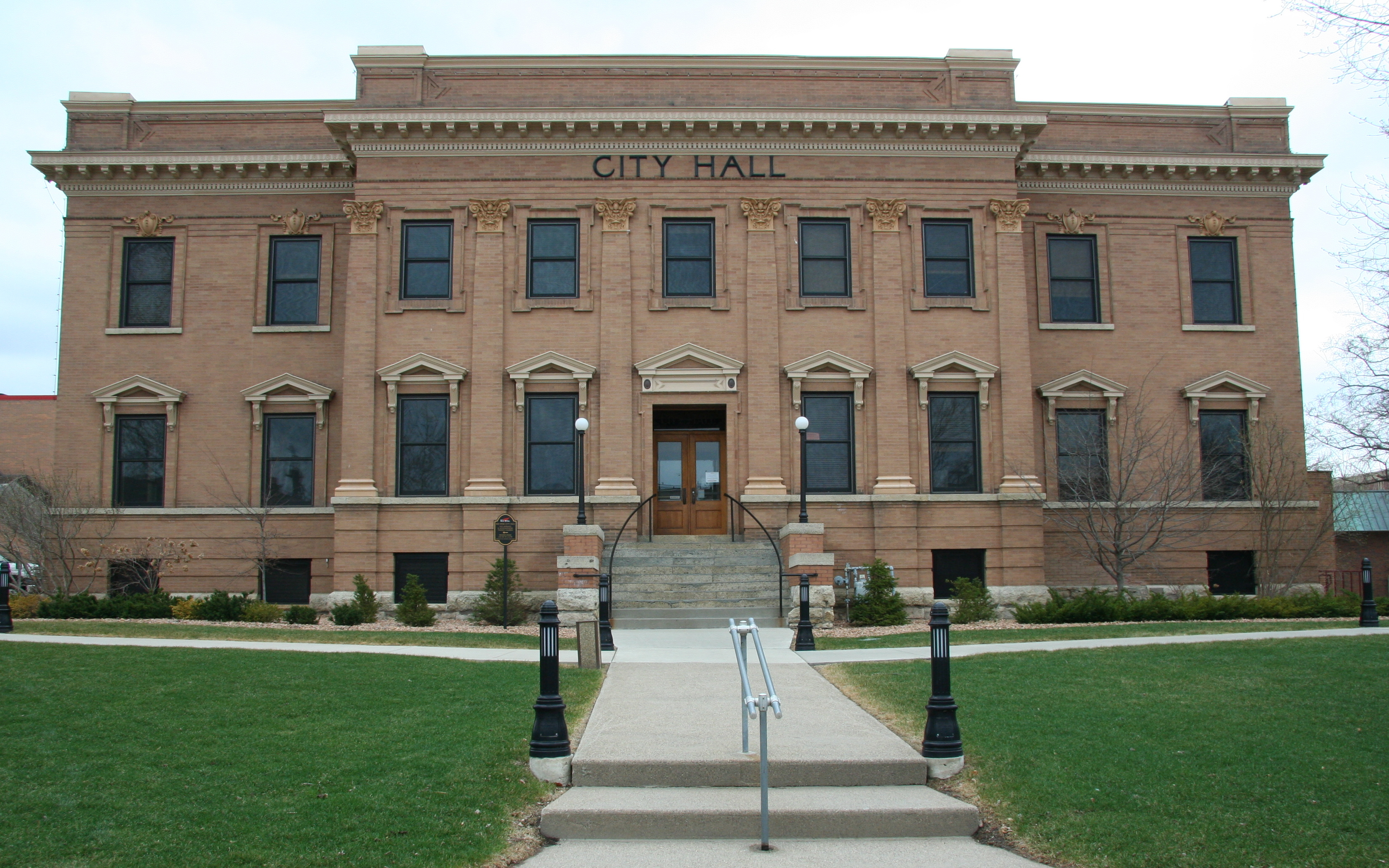
Red Wing City Hall, listed on the National Register of Historic Places

The mayor is Gary Iocco. His term ends in January 2029.

== Media ==
=== Print ===
The Red Wing Republican Eagle is published two days per week.

=== Radio ===
KCUE, an AM classic country station, and KWNG, an FM classic hits station, are both licensed to Red Wing.

== Infrastructure ==
=== Transportation ===
Red Wing is connected to Wisconsin by Red Wing Bridge (officially named the Eisenhower Bridge); it carries U.S. Route 63 over the Mississippi River and its backwaters. U.S. Routes 61 and 63 and Minnesota State Highways 19 and 58 are the main intercity highways. Minnesota State Highway 292 is also in the city.

Red Wing Regional Airport is across the Mississippi River in Pierce County, Wisconsin, near Wisconsin Highway 35 .

Red Wing's Amtrak station is served by Amtrak's Empire Builder daily in each direction between Chicago to the east and Seattle and Portland to the west, as well as the Borealis daily in each direction between St. Paul to north and Chicago to the south.

== Notable people ==
- Eugenie Anderson (1909–1997), U.S. ambassador to Denmark and Bulgaria
- Tams Bixby (1855–1922), born in Red Wing, member of U.S. Dawes Commission
- Ryan Boldt (born 1994), baseball player
- Joseph Francis Busch (1866–1953), Roman Catholic bishop
- William C. Christianson (1892–1985), Minnesota Supreme Court justice
- William J. Colvill, (1830–1905), Civil War hero and Minnesota attorney general
- Frances Densmore (1867–1957), ethnographer and ethnomusicologist
- Orin Densmore (1805–1872), Minnesota state representative and businessman
- Philip S. Duff (1922–1997), Minnesota state senator and newspaper editor
- Joanell Dyrstad (born 1942), Minnesota lieutenant governor (1991–1995)
- Patrick Flueger (born 1983), actor
- Mikkjel Hemmestveit (1863–1957), skiing champion
- Torjus Hemmestveit (1860–1930), skiing champion
- Stanley E. Hubbard (1897–1992), founder of Hubbard Broadcasting
- Philander P. Humphrey (1823–1862), physician, politician
- Richard R. Lemke (1930–2016), Minnesota state legislator and farmer
- Ned Locke (1919–1992), television personality, Bozo's Circus
- Martin Maginnis (1841–1919), politician, Union Army veteran
- Lyle Mehrkens (1937–2018), Minnesota state legislator and farmer
- Sam Nordquist, group home worker
- Lauris Norstad (1907–1988), Supreme Allied Commander, Europe (SACEUR, NATO) and Commander in Chief of the U.S. European Command
- Greg Norton (born 1959), bassist for Hüsker Dü and restaurateur
- Henrietta Barclay Paist (1870–1930), artist, designer, teacher, and author
- Robert Ezra Park (1864–1944), urban sociologist
- Mitchell Peters (1935–2017), percussionist with the Los Angeles Philharmonic Orchestra
- John Pohl (born 1979), NHL player
- Trapper Schoepp (born 1990), musician
- James Touchi-Peters (born 1956), symphonic conductor, composer and jazz singer
- Theodore Swanson (1873–1959), farmer, Wisconsin legislator
- Charles Carroll Webster (1824–1893), lawyer and Minnesota state senator
- Jacqueline West (born 1979), poet and author of The Books of Elsewhere
- Phyllis Yes (born 1941), feminist artist

== Sister cities ==
Red Wing has three sister cities, as designated by Sister Cities International:

- Ikata, Japan
- Quzhou, China
- Kongsberg, Norway

== See also ==
- Red Wing Collectors Society
- Red Wing High School
