= Red Wing Collectors Society =

The RWCS logo

The Red Wing Collectors Society, Inc. has been dedicated to the preservation of Red Wing and other American pottery since 1977. The Red Wing Collectors Society is a special interest collecting organization in the United States with a membership of about 5000.

== Organization history ==
The Red Wing Collectors Society (RWCS) was founded in 1977 in conjunction with the Red Wing Collectors Society Newsletter, published by Dave Newkirk. The popularity of the RWCS Newsletter subscription and the publication of "The Clay Giants" by Rev. Lyndon Veil laid the cornerstone for a meeting of like-minded collectors to gather in Red Wing, MN in July 1977. It was at that one-day event held at the Goodhue County Historical Society in July 1977 that the RWCS officially became an organization. Those who attended the event and joined the RWCS that day are considered charter members of the organization. Of the 300-500 people that attended the event, just over 200 people became members and over 75 of those members are still active as of October 2008.

From its start the RWCS has been dedicated to keeping what its members refer to as the "Red Wing legacy" alive. Its members focus on continually learning about the pottery products made in Red Wing, Minnesota and on making that information available to others.

== Organization structure ==
The RWCS maintains a board of directors that is responsible for many of the decisions of the Society. Positions on the board include President, Vice President, Secretary, Treasurer, Historian, Auction Manager, Education Manager, Commemorative Manager, and two Representatives-at-large. The Society's Executive Director is a non-voting member of the board. Board meeting times and locations are published in the bimonthly newsletter and are open for any member to attend.

During the annual Convention, held the second weekend in July, there is a general business meeting in which all members of the Society present may vote on issues, bylaw changes, and elect new officers to the board during election years.

=== Membership ===
Membership is available to any individual who pays the annual membership dues. There are two levels of membership, Primary and Associate. A Primary member receives all benefits of membership, which include a bimonthly newsletter, the right to vote at the annual meeting, the ability to attend all portions of Society functions, the right to purchase a commemorative, and access to the Society's lending library of video materials. The cost of Primary membership dues is $35 annually as of August, 2013. An Associate membership is available to any member of a household in which there is already a Primary member (i.e. a spouse or child of a Primary member). Associate membership is $15 annually and includes all the benefits of membership with the exclusion of receipt of a newsletter.

=== Chapters ===
There are multiple local chapters of the Society. Each chapter is chartered by the RWCS and holds its own meetings and functions throughout the year. Many of them also hold smaller functions in conjunction with the two RWCS sponsored events, the July Convention and the MidWinter GetTogether, held in February. Membership in the RWCS is a requirement for membership in one of its chapters. Chapters often operate much like the Society but on a smaller scale, including the production of chapter commemoratives as a fundraising activity. As of 2008 there were sixteen chapters in the United States. Golden State Red Wing Chapter founded In 1987 in California.

== Annual events ==
The RWCS holds two official events every year, the Convention and MidWinter GetTogether.

=== Convention ===
The July Convention is held every year and is the original event of the society. The first convention was held in July 1977 in Red Wing, Minnesota. Since then there has been an annual convention and business meeting of the society in July in Red Wing. The most recent venue has been the Red Wing High School. Educational seminars, an auction, a show and sale, displays of pottery, and children's events are held.

=== MidWinter GetTogether ===
The MidWinter GetTogether is held in February. Meant to be an event that may relocate to new locations if possible, it has been held in Des Moines, Iowa since at least 2003. It was held in Wisconsin in 2015 and 2016 and will return to Des Moines in 2017. This is a smaller event than the Convention and is attended by fewer members. Educational seminars, a show and sale, social events, and children's events are held.

=== Chapter meetings and events ===
Chapters of the RWCS hold meetings throughout the year. Depending on the chapter these meetings may be held anywhere from monthly to four times annually. Some chapters hold annual special events in addition to their regular business meetings.
