= Torjus Hemmestveit =

Norwegian Nordic skier (1860–1930)

Personal information
- Nationality: Norway
- Born: 13 November 1860 Kviteseid, Telemark, Norway
- Died: 7 June 1930 (aged 69) Pennington County, MN, US

Sport
- Sport: Skiing

Achievements and titles
- Personal bests: 31.4 m (103 ft); Red Wing, United States (15 January 1893)

Torjus Hemmestveit (13 November 1860 – 7 June 1930) was a Norwegian Nordic skier who shared the Holmenkollen medal with his brother, Mikkjel Hemmestveit in 1928.

== Career ==
Torjus and Mikkjel Hemmestveit were born in Kviteseid Municipality in Telemark county, Norway. They were from the village of Morgedal, whose most famous resident was Sondre Norheim, commonly referred to as the father of modern skiing. The brothers had a key role in the development of Telemark skiing by creating the world's first skiing school in 1881 at Christiania, Norway (now Oslo).

The brothers emigrated to the United States in the late 19th century and ran several ski schools there. They changed the spelling of their surname to Hemmestvedt in the United States. They competed in The Aurora Ski Club in Red Wing, Minnesota. Torgus Hemmestvedt died on 7 June 1930 in Pennington County, Minnesota.

On 15 January 1893, he beat his brothers' previous ski jumping world record distance at 103 feet (31 metres) on McSorley Hill in Red Wing, Minnesota, United States.

== Ski jumping world record ==
Date	Hill	Location	Metres	Feet
15 January 1893	McSorley Hill	Red Wing, United States	31.4	103
