= Red Wing Pottery =

- Minnesota Stoneware Company
- U.S. National Register of Historic Places
- Location within Minnesota
- Location: 1997 West Main Street, Red Wing, Minnesota
- Nearest city: Red Wing, Minnesota
- Coordinates: 44°33′51″N 92°33′33″W
- NRHP reference No.: 79001243
- Added to NRHP: December 26, 1979

Red Wing pottery refers to American stoneware, pottery, or dinnerware items made in Red Wing, Minnesota. The first commercial company was set up in 1861 by German immigrant John Paul, which eventually became Red Wing Potteries, Inc. in 1936. Pottery is still manufactured in Red Wing today.

== History ==
Clay from the upper Mississippi has been used to make ceramic vessels in what is now Minnesota since the Late Woodland period. In the 1860s, English and German settlers to the region began using clay soil to make stoneware. John Paul, a German immigrant potter, made stoneware on a farm near Red Bull, between 1861 and 1863, using the techniques he had previously learned. Over the years, many different ink stamped, impressed, and hand painted marks were used.

The first commercial pottery workshop was the Red Wing Terra Cotta Works, which opened in 1868. Operated by William M. Philleo, the company moved to St. Paul in 1880 and added silica to the natural red clay.

In 1877, the Red Wing Stoneware Company began to mass-produce pottery. The company made durable stoneware used in agriculture: crocks, jugs, jars, butter churns, spittoons, water coolers, and feeders for poultry. Within fifteen years, Minnesota Stoneware (making salt-glazed pottery) and North Star Stoneware imitated Red Wing Stoneware's success. The two companies merged into Union Stoneware in 1894. In 1906, Union Stoneware and Red Wing Stoneware merged to form the Red Wing Union Stoneware Company and shipped Red Wing pottery nationwide.

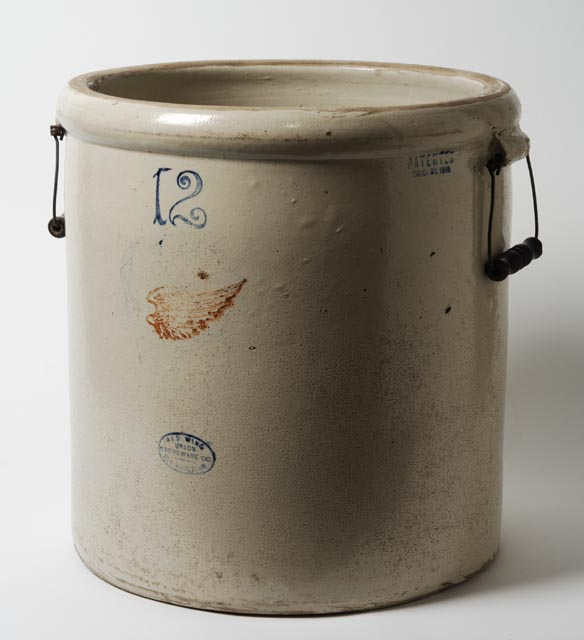
Crock manufactured by the company.

RumRill Art pottery, founded by George Rumrill, was made by Red Wing from 1933 to 1937. George Rumrill was an art pottery designer & salesman who contracted with Red Wing to make his art pottery. RumRill shapes were numbered from 50 to 677. From 1938 to 1941 RumRill pottery was made in Ohio and possibly by Shawnee Pottery, Gondor Pottery and Florence Pottery in Mount Gilead, OH

After World War I, demand for agricultural stoneware decreased. Red Wing potters made art pottery: decorative, functional, and beautiful vases, planters, umbrella stands, and more. They also reproduced RumRill shapes. During this era, potters applied vibrant and exuberant glazes.

In 1936, the company took the name Red Wing Potteries, Inc. and worked with designers Charles Murphy, Belle Kogan, and Eva Zeisel. It introduced hand-painted lines of dinnerware and art pottery, and discontinued agricultural stoneware. By the 1960s, Red Wing produced more than a million pieces of pottery per year.

Following World War II, Red Wing Potteries competed with imported ceramics, lost department store sales, and pivoted to grocery store dinnerware sales. New management tried to shrink the workforce and cut costs. A union shop since the 1940s, Red Wing Potteries closed in 1967 during a labor strike over wages, health insurance, and benefits. The labor crisis, declining sales, and the loss of market share led to the closing of the company.

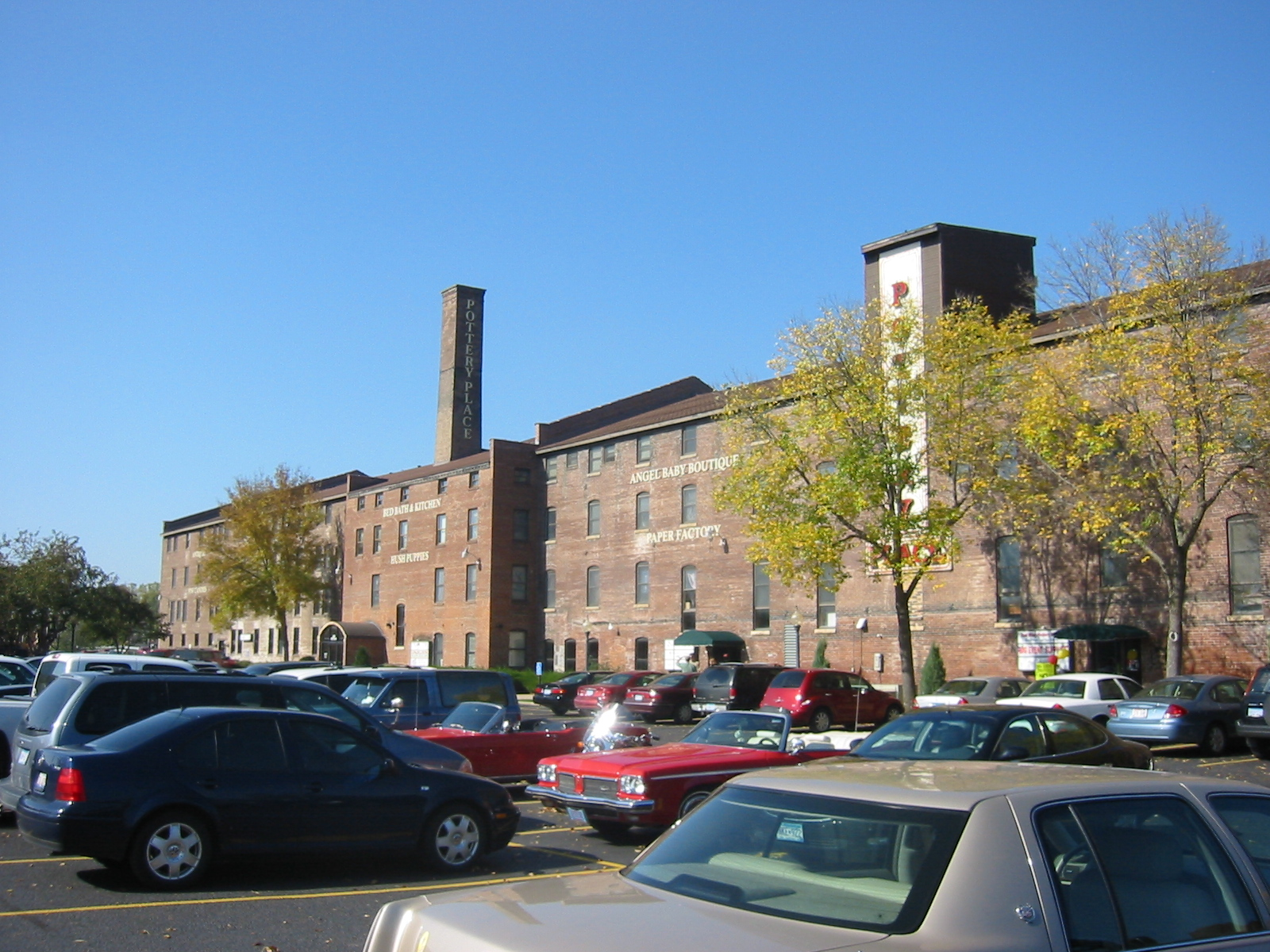
The former Minnesota Stoneware Company building in Red Wing.

A new company, Red Wing Pottery, was formed in 1967 when Richard A. Gillmer (the last President of Red Wing Potteries) purchased the company from the other shareholders during liquidation. The company operated primarily as a retail business until 1996 when the third generation of the Gillmer family began production again with a smaller output than the company had in its early boom years. In 1984 John Falconer bought the rights to the name Red Wing Stoneware Company and started manufacturing stoneware again in Red Wing. In 2013 Bruce and Irene Johnson purchased the company.In August 2019, the Johnsons ceased production of pottery.

== Legacy ==
Red Wing pottery is showcased around the world in museums such as the Minnesota Historical Society, the British Museum, the Metroplitan Museum of Art, the Museum of Modern Art, the Brooklyn Museum, and the Cooper Hewitt, Smithsonian Design Museum.

== Samples of wares ==
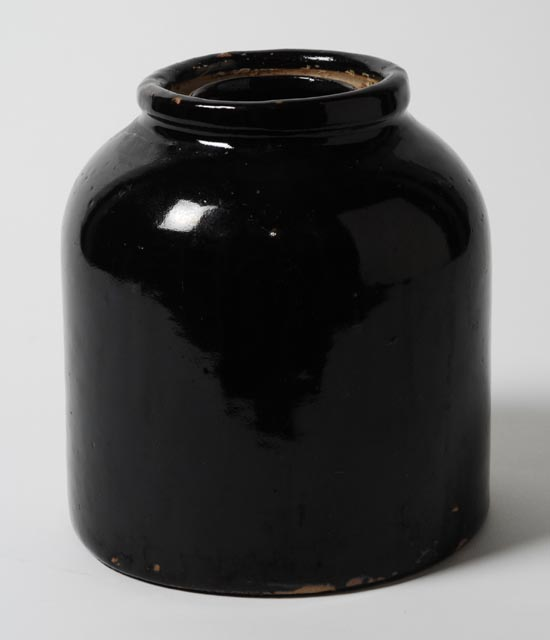

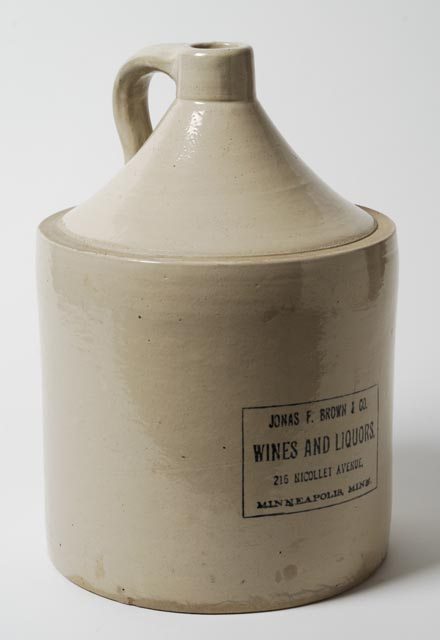

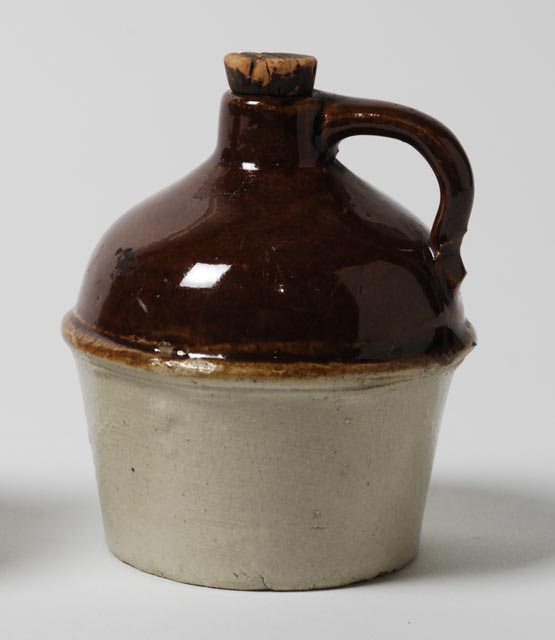

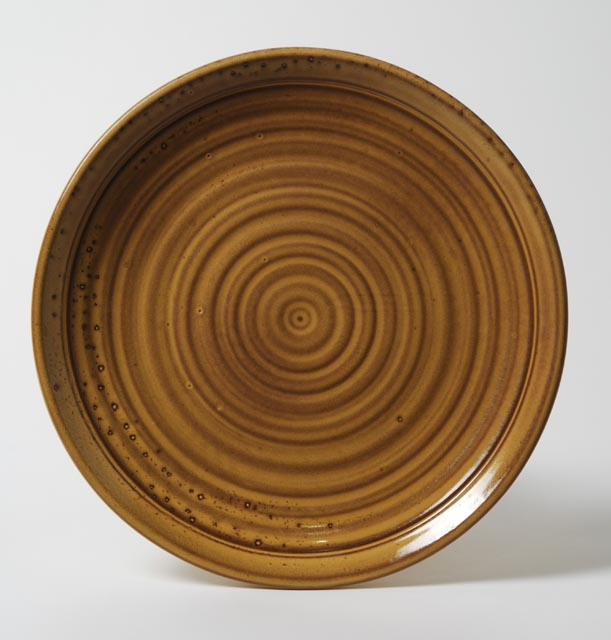

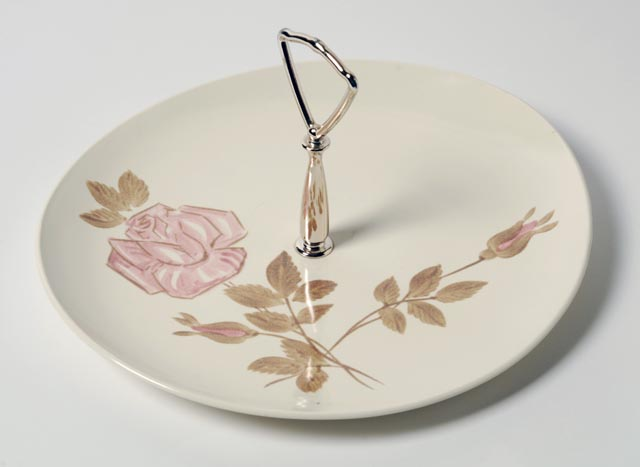

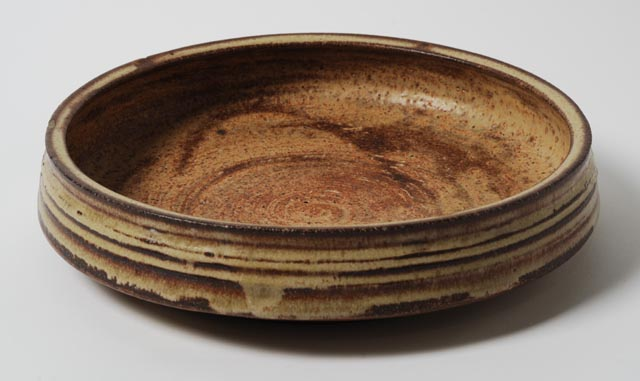

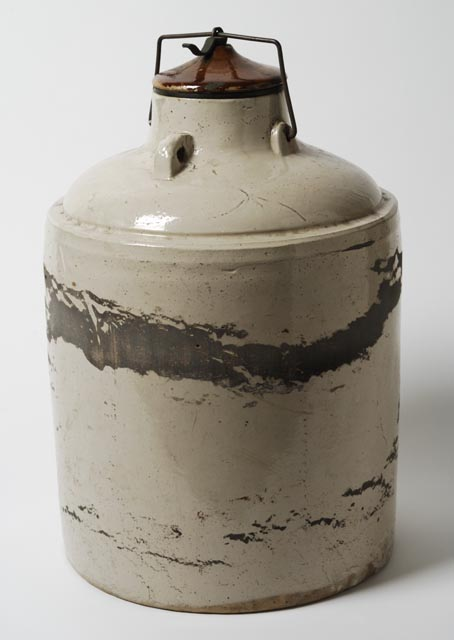

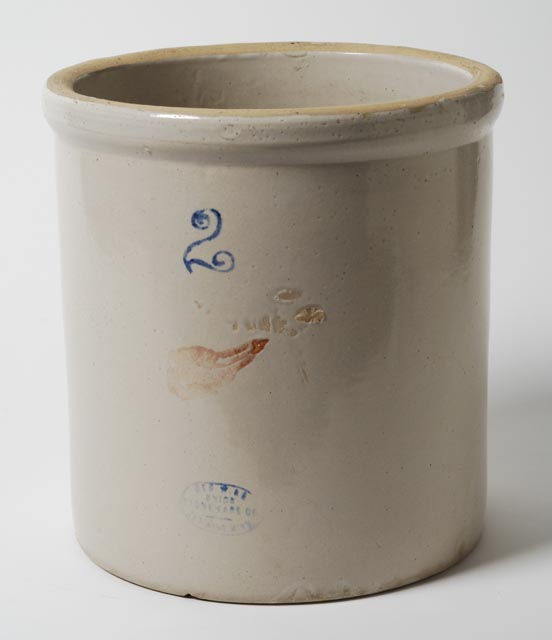

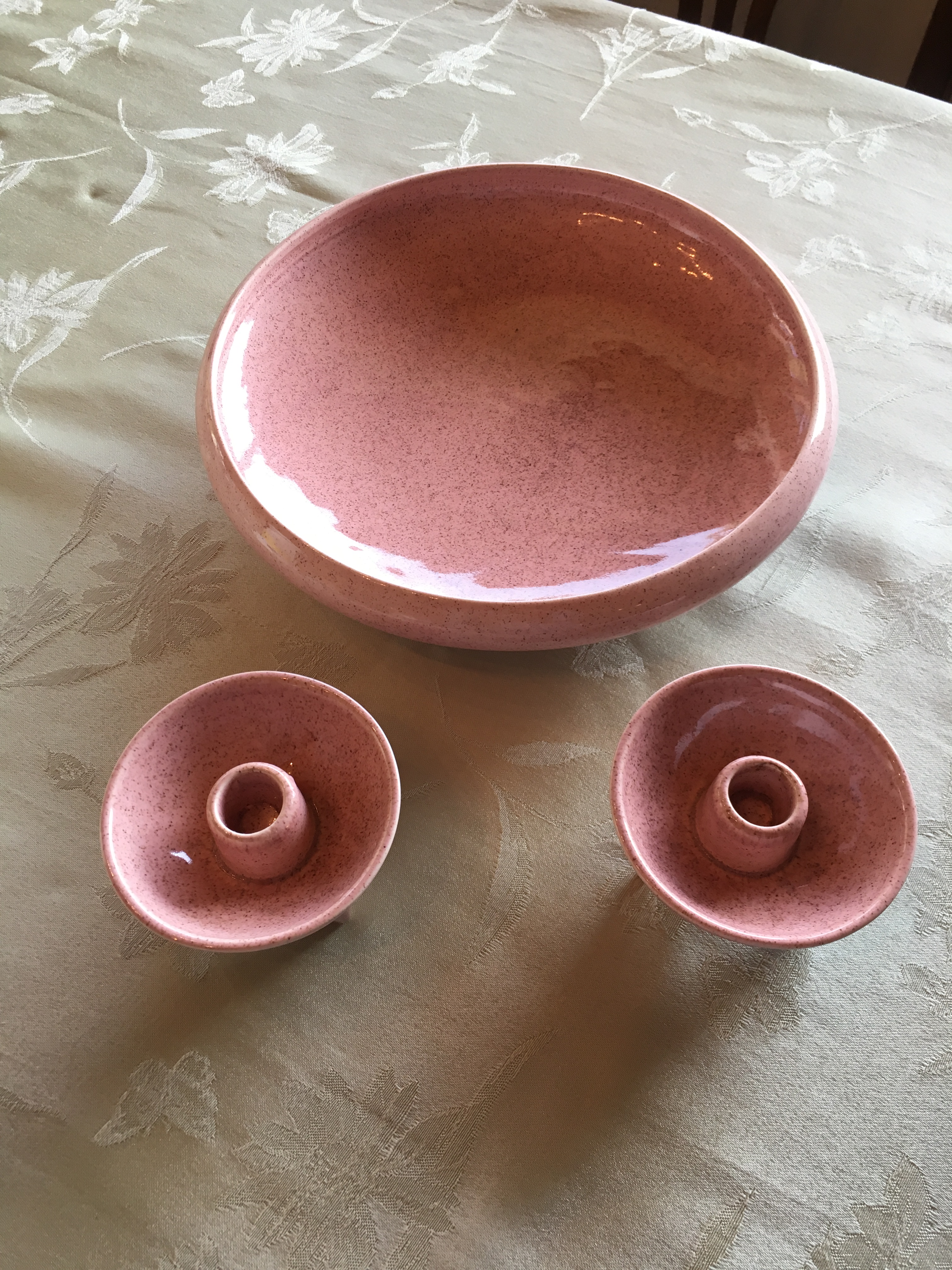
"Pink Fleck" candle holders and matching bowl

== See also ==
- Red Wing Collectors Society
- Fiesta (dinnerware)
