= Mikkjel Hemmestveit =

Norwegian-American Nordic skier

Personal information
- Nationality: Norway; United States
- Born: 6 March 1863 Kviteseid, Telemark, Norway
- Died: 22 April 1957 (aged 94) Minnesota, US

Sport
- Sport: Skiing

Achievements and titles
- Personal bests: 31.1 m (102 ft); Red Wing, US (9 March 1891)

Mikkjel Hemmestveit (6 March 1863 – 22 April 1957), was a Norwegian-American Nordic skier who shared the Holmenkollen medal with his brother, Torjus Hemmestveit in 1928.

== Biography ==
Mikkjel Hemmestveit was born on the Hemmingstveit farm in Kviteseid Municipality in Telemark county, Norway. Both Torjus and Mikkjel Hemmestveit were from the village of Morgedal, whose most famous resident was Sondre Norheim, commonly referred to as the father of modern skiing. The brothers had a key role in the development of Telemark skiing by creating the world's first skiing school in 1881 at Christiania, Norway (now Oslo).

The brothers would emigrate to the United States, Mikkel (1886) and Torjus (1888), and ran several ski schools in their new country. In the United States, they changed the spelling of their surname to Hemmestvedt and Mikkjel became Mikkel.

The first actual recorded tournament in the Midwest took place in St. Paul, Minnesota on January 25, 1887. Hemmestveit and his brother Torjus took the sport south to Red Wing, Minnesota with an exhibition tourney on February 8, 1887, sponsored by the Aurora Ski Club of Red Wing. The first recorded North American distance record was set in 1887 by Mikkel Hemmestvedt when he flew 37 feet at Red Wing, Minnesota. They became members and competed in the Aurora Ski Club.

On 9 March 1891, he set the ski jumping world record distance at 102 feet (31 metres) on McSorley Hill in Red Wing, Minnesota, United States.

Mikkel Hemmestveit returned to Morgedal in 1894 while his brother Torjus remained in Minnesota. In 1928 they both were awarded the Holmenkollen medal (Holmenkollmedaljen).

== Ski jumping world record ==
Date	Hill	Location	Metres	Feet
9 March 1891	McSorley Hill	Red Wing, United States	31.1	102

== Other sources ==
- Frederick L. Johnson (2004) Sky Crashers: A History of the Aurora Ski Club (Goodhue County Historical Society) ISBN 978-0961719753
