= Floridiana =

Artifacts and collections relating to Florida

Floridiana is a term referring to artifacts and collections of artifacts relating to the state of Florida in the United States of America, especially those artifacts pertaining to Floridian history, geography, folklore, and cultural heritage.

Mediums, objects, and themes falling into the category of Floridiana could include paintings, prints, drawings, and postcards representing Florida's history or culture; fiction, non-fiction, music, and poetry describing or alluding to the state; tools and equipment commonly used in the state, for example fishing and hunting equipment; and industries prevalent in the state, for example tourism, citrus growing, and sugar production.

Nostalgia is often an element in the appreciation of Floridiana - the nostalgia that evokes yearning for an unattainable or irrecoverable state, where the Floridian wilderness as well as its pioneering spirit have been decimated by urban and industrial growth, as in the fiction of Carl Hiaasen, and the lyrics of early Jimmy Buffett.

The self-published author Seth Bramson, also founder and president of the Miami Memorabilia Collectors Club, supposedly holds the largest private collection of Floridiana artifacts, The Bramson Archive.

== See also ==
- Florida literature
- Mickler's Floridiana
