= WPVW =

Coordinates: 44°20′46″N 91°58′41″W

- Wabasha, Minnesota; United States
- Frequency: 1190 kHz
- Branding: Pure Country WPVW 99.7 FM and 1190 AM

Programming
- Format: Classic country
- Affiliations: Fox News Radio; Minnesota Twins; Minnesota Vikings

Ownership
- Owner: Q Media Group, LLC
- Sister stations: KCUE, KLCH, KWNG

History
- First air date: 1976; 50 years ago (as KWMB)
- Former call signs: KWMB (1976–1994); KMFX (1994–2011); WBHA (2011–2023)

Technical information
- Licensing authority: FCC
- Facility ID: 54624
- Class: D
- Power: 1,000 watts day
- Translator: 99.7 W259CG (Alma, Wisconsin)

Links
- Public license information: Public file; LMS
- Website: Official Website

WPVW (1190 AM) is a radio station licensed to serve Wabasha, Minnesota. It is owned by Q Media Group, LLC and airs a classic country format.

== History ==
=== Beginnings as KWMB ===
WPVW's beginnings can be traced back to January 12, 1974, when the construction permit was first granted. The station was first assigned the call sign KWMB, which it kept for 18 years after going on the air in 1976.

After a set of hearings filed by a competitive applicant, KWMB signed on April 6, 1976 as a strictly sunrise to sunset operation. Obed S. Borgen was the licensee and Russ Chesney served as general manager. The station signed on with a country music and farm information format, which continues to this day. For much of its history, the station went by the slogan "The Voice in the Valley".

In September 1977, KWMB was granted permission to operate at a pre-sunrise authority power level of 500 watts, allowing it to sign on two hours before local sunrise. The station has continuously signed on at 6 am since then.

=== First sale ===
In November 1985, Borgen agreed to sell KWMB to Interstate Communications, a company headed by John Meisch, Jr., who served as president and general manager. The popular format of country music and farm information continued.

=== Second sale ===
In June 1990, Interstate Communications decided to sell KWMB and the construction permit for sister FM station KMFX-FM to Radio Ingstad Minnesota, for $275,000.

Upon acquisition of KMWB and KMFX-FM, Radio Ingstad Minnesota moved the construction permit for KMFX-FM from Wabasha to Lake City, effectively allowing it to serve the much larger Rochester market. KMFX-FM went on the air the following year.

In 1994, KWMB adopted the call letters of its FM sister station. Concurrent with the call sign change was the decision to simulcast KMFX-FM's programming for about 90 percent of the broadcast day. However, the station still maintained its local office at 62 1/2 W. Pembroke Avenue in Wabasha.

=== Third and fourth sales ===
In July 1998, Radio Ingstad Minnesota entered into an agreement to sell KMFX/KMFX-FM to Cumulus Media for an undisclosed sum. Less than two years later, the stations were spun off to Clear Channel Communications, taking effect on September 25, 2000. Operations for KMFX were then moved to its FM sister in Rochester, where simulcast operations continued until January 10, 2008, when corporate executives decided to take the station silent. In paperwork filed with the FCC, Clear Channel cited poor financial performance as the reason for going silent. The FCC approved the Special Temporary Authority application on February 20, 2008.

=== Current ownership ===
Clear Channel kept KMFX dark for a period of about three years, when it donated the station to a non-profit group, Minority Media and Telecommunications Council, based in Washington, DC. However, the station would not sign on under the new owner, but was instead sold by MMTC to a Minnesota-based owner, Q Media LLC, for $15,000. This company, headed by Alan Quarnstrom, owns six other stations in surrounding markets. Upon the consummation of the sale to Q Media on June 15, 2011, the station resumed regular broadcast operations, changing its call sign to WBHA.

On July 9, 2013, Q Media acquired an FM translator at 99.7 from Faith Sound, Inc., for $75,000, and signed on with WBHA's programming a short time later. The station's operations today originate out of Red Wing, with Q Media's other stations.

On October 26, 2023, WBHA changed its call sign to WPVW.
