= Shakopee I =

Mdewakanton Dakota chief

The chief usually referred to today as Shakopee I was known to American explorers and Indian agents as the third-highest ranking leader of the Mdewakanton Dakota, after Chief Wabasha II and Chief Little Crow I. He was the chief of a band of Mdewakanton Sioux called the Taoapa and they had the largest village on the Minnesota River, located in the 1820s on the river's north bank, later moved to the south bank in present-day Shakopee.

According to a popular narrative by Charlotte Van Cleve, Shakopee (or Old Shakopee's son, "Little Six") was executed in 1827 while running a gauntlet at Fort Snelling, as punishment for an attack on the Ojibwe. However, Van Cleve was eight years old at the time, and her version of events has not been confirmed by historians, nor by other eyewitness accounts.

== Relations with Americans and British ==
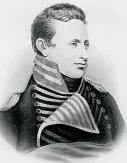
Lt. Zebulon Pike held a council at St. Peters in 1805

=== Council with Pike ===
Chief Shakopee was one of the seven Dakota who attended a council with U.S. Lieutenant Zebulon Pike on September 23, 1805. Pike, whose written French was full of errors, referred to Shakopee in his journal as "Le Demi Douzen." Shakopee, however, did not end up signing the Treaty of St. Peters, which granted the United States approximately 100,000 acres of land at the mouth of the Minnesota River, for the purposes of building a fort. Historian Gary Clayton Anderson suggests that the two chiefs who did sign the treaty, Little Crow I and Penichon, probably had the best claims to the land which would later form the Fort Snelling military reservation.

=== Relations with O'Fallon ===
In 1816, American treaty commissioners met with nearly ten eastern Sioux chiefs and headmen in St. Louis to negotiate peace following the War of 1812 and to reaffirm the terms of Pike's 1805 treaty. However, Shakopee's name does not appear as a signatory to the 1816 treaty, which was signed instead by Mdewakanton chiefs such as Tatankamani (Red Wing II), Bad Hail and Penichon.

In the fall of 1817, Chief Shakopee went to Prairie du Chien to meet with U.S. Indian agent Benjamin O'Fallon. O'Fallon reported that Shakopee expressed strong friendship for the American people. He quoted Shakopee as saying, "Bad Birds", [meaning the British], "have attempted to whisper in my ears. They told me to turn my back upon the smooth face chief [O'Fallon]." According to O'Fallon, Shakopee said that he would reject the advice of the British, and invited him to visit his village the following year with presents and to "drag from among them" the British who were corrupting his young men.

=== Forsyth expedition ===
In 1819, Major Thomas Forsyth was sent by the United States Department of War to visit the Sioux Indians to distribute approximately US$2,000 worth of goods as payment for lands ceded to the U.S. in the 1805 treaty signed with Pike (also known as "Pike's Purchase"). Forsyth, who was generally unimpressed with the upper Mississippi River valley, was highly critical of most of the Dakota he met during his expedition. On July 26, 1819, while recovering from illness, he met with Chief Shakopee and two other leaders at the mouth of the St. Peter's (Minnesota River). He reported feeling offended by Shakopee's aggressiveness. In a journal entry dated July 26, Forsyth wrote:

Yesterday evening three chiefs arrived with many followers, viz: The Six, whose village is thirty miles up the river St. Peter's; the Arrow, twenty-four miles still higher, and the Killiew (thus named from a species of eagle) whose village is six miles still higher. They wished to go about business immediately; but it was too late. This morning we met and had some talk, but I by no means liked the countenance of Mr. Six, nor did I like his talk; I gave them the remainder of my goods, yet the Six wanted more. Not having any more, they had to do without. I found on enquiring that Mr. Six is a good-for-nothing fellow, and rather gives bad counsel to his young men than otherwise. In all my talks with those Indians, I generally told them the same I told the Leaf [Wabasha]; and in all cases I had to give each band a little whisky. These are the last Indians I am to see in this quarter; therefore, I am done with the Sioux for this year.

=== Second Long expedition ===
In 1823, Major Stephen Harriman Long returned to the Minnesota River on a scientific expedition, together with geologist William H. Keating, naturalist Thomas Say, and topographer James Edward Calhoun. Long arrived at "the village of the Six" on July 10, and found that most of the Dakota who lived there were away on a hunting expedition. At this time, he reported that Shakopee's village was on the north side of the Minnesota River. The village would later move to the south side of the river, to where present-day Shakopee, Minnesota is today.

William H. Keating, who accompanied Long on the expedition but traveled in a separate boat, referred to Shakopee's band as "Taoapa," and wrote:

The chief of this part is called Shakpa, which means six. He inherited his station, and is a distinguished man, ranking in the nation third only to Wapasha and Petit Corbeau. He has but one village; it is situated on the St. Peter, between which river and the Mississippi he hunts.

== 1825 Treaty of Prairie du Chien ==
On August 19, 1825, Chief Shakopee signed the 1825 Treaty of Prairie du Chien as "Sha-co-pe (the Sixth)" under the section marked "Sioux."

The chiefs and headmen from tribes including the Dakota Sioux, the Ojibwe, the Sauk and Meskwaki (Fox), the Menomonee, the Iowa, the Ho-Chunk (Winnebago), and the Odawa gathered at Prairie du Chien. The United States treaty commissioners were Governor William Clark of Missouri Territory and Governor Lewis Cass of Michigan Territory.

After lengthy negotiations, the Dakota and Ojibwe tribes finally agreed to define rather complicated boundary lines between their tribes. They also agreed in principle to maintain "a firm and perpetual peace between the Sioux and Chippewas." Chief Shakopee was among the Dakota representatives who spoke at the council in support of a general feeling of fellowship with the other tribes, along with Chief Wabasha II, Chief Little Crow I, and Tatankamani (Red Wing II).

However, the treaty failed to achieve its goal of establishing a lasting intertribal peace. Within months, it became clear that neither the Dakota nor the Ojibwe were willing to be governed by the boundaries established in the treaty, and the tribes quickly reverted to their previous pattern of hostilities.

== Running the gauntlet at Fort Snelling ==
On May 27, 1827, several Mdewakanton and Wahpeton warriors fired into an Ojibwe encampment that had been set up just below the walls of Fort Snelling, killing two including one young girl, and severely wounding at least six others. The incident occurred shortly after a day of peaceful trading between the Ojibwe and the Dakota Sioux. The Ojibwe warrior Strong Earth demanded justice from Colonel Josiah Snelling. Furious, Snelling sent out two companies the next morning which quickly rounded up a dozen Dakota. He then threatened to hang the men unless the guilty warriors were handed over within three days.

A total of four men were handed over to Snelling, including two warriors from Shakopee's band, and two Wahpetons from the Little Rapids of the Minnesota River. Snelling turned the men over to the Ojibwe, who told them to run for their lives before executing them.

=== Uncorroborated account of execution ===
Charlotte Van Cleve, the daughter of Major Nathan Clark, was eight years old at the time of the execution at Fort Snelling. According to her memoirs published in 1888, a total of five men were executed in punishment for the murders. Van Cleve names "Little Six" as one of the men executed, but this is not confirmed by any of the other eyewitness accounts, nor by historians. Historian Doane Robinson suggested it was possible that "Little Six, a son of Old Shakopee's," was among the warriors who fired on the encampment, but stopped short of confirming that he was executed.

In her vivid account of the execution, Charlotte Van Cleve recalls "Little Six" fondly and describes how bravely he ran a gauntlet manned by the Chippewa as part of his punishment:

And then the last, "Little Six," whom, at a distance, we children readily recognize from his commanding height and graceful form; he is our friend, and we hope he will get home. He starts; they fire; the smoke clears away, and still he is running. We clap our hands and say, "He will get home!" but, another volley, and our favorite, almost at the goal, springs into the air and comes down—dead! I cover my face, and shed tears of real sorrow for our friend... We talk with quivering lips and tearful eyes of "Little Six," and the many kind things he has done for us—the bows and arrows, the mocauks of sugar, the pretty beaded moccasins he has given us; and we wish, oh! we wish he could have run faster, or that the Chippewa rifles had missed fire. And we sleep and dream of scalps, and rifles, and war-whoops, and frightful yells, and wake wishing it had all been a dream.

William J. Snelling, son of Colonel Josiah Snelling, was 23 years old at the time of the execution. His first-person account of the execution names only Tooponca Zeze, a member of Shakopee's band, as one of the four men executed. According to Snelling, Tooponca Zeze had been brought in by an old man named Eagle Head, a highly influential man who was not a chief.
