= USS Wapasha =

Tugboat of the United States Navy

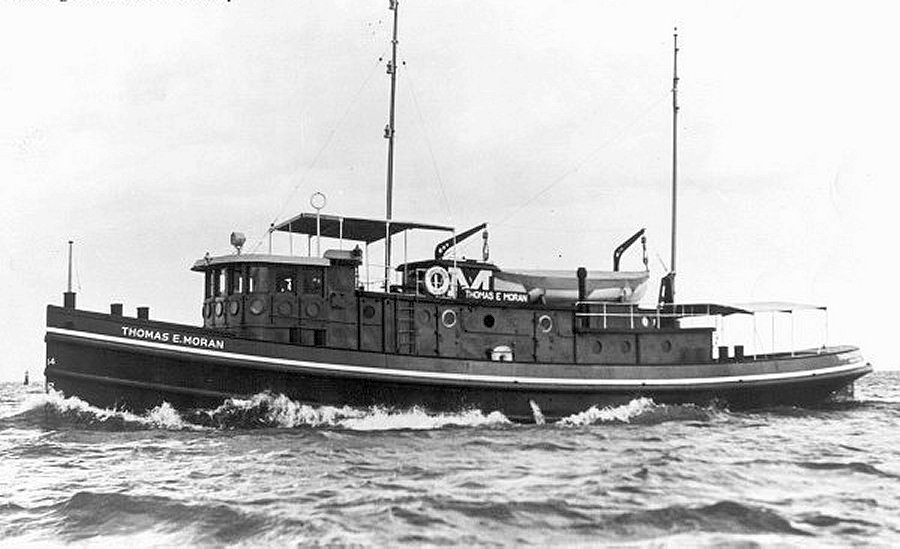
- Commercial tug William J. Moran in 1938–1940, prior to her 1941–1947 U.S. Navy service as USS Wapasha

History

United States
- Name: USS Wapasha
- Namesake: Wapasha, the name of four Mdewakanton Sioux chiefs
- Builder: Defoe Boat and Motor Works, Inc., Bay City, Michigan
- Completed: September 1938
- Acquired: 9 December 1940
- Commissioned: 27 January 1941
- Decommissioned: 11 February 1947
- Reclassified: Tug-class net tender, YNT-13, 8 April 1942; Large harbor tug, YTB-737, 4 August 1945
- Stricken: 11 March 1947
- Fate: Transferred to Maritime Commission for disposal 16 May 1947
- Notes: In commercial service as William J. Moran 1938–1940; In commercial service as Anne Moran from 1947 and as Yankee from 1976

General characteristics
- Type: Net tender; later large harbor tug
- Displacement: 200 tons
- Length: 94 ft 4.5 in (28.766 m)
- Beam: 25 ft 10 in (7.87 m)
- Draft: 8 ft 6 in (2.59 m)
- Propulsion: Diesel engine, single propeller
- Speed: 13 knots
- Armament: 2 x .30-caliber (7.62-millimeter) machine guns

USS Wapasha (YN-45), later YNT-13, later YTB-737, was a United States Navy net tender, later large harbor tug, in commission from 1941 to 1947.

Wapasha was built as the steel-hulled, single-screw tug William J. Moran, completed in September 1938 at Bay City, Michigan, by the Defoe Boat and Motor Works, Inc. William J. Moran was acquired by the U.S. Navy from the Moran Towing and Transportation Company of New York City, 9 December 1940. The tug was classified as a yard net tender, renamed USS Wapasha, and designated YN-45 on 25 December 1940. Converted for naval use at the New York Navy Yard in Brooklyn, New York, Wapasha was placed in service on 27 January 1941.

Wapasha was allocated to the 1st Naval District at Boston, Massachusetts, which became her home port. After shifting to Boston on 1 February 1941, she took up her net tending duties in Narragansett Bay, based at Naval Training Center Newport at Newport, Rhode Island. During her service there, which lasted into 1947, she was twice reclassified: on 8 April 1942 she was reclassified a tug-class net tender and redesignated YNT-13 and, on 4 August 1945, she was reclassified a large harbor tug and redesignated YTB-737.

Placed out of service on 11 February 1947, Wapasha was struck from the Navy List on 11 March 1947 and turned over to the Maritime Commission for disposal on 16 May 1947. Acquired by Tug Anne Moran, Inc., of New York City, the vessel was renamed Anne Moran and performed harbor tug services in New York Harbor. She was sold in 1976 to Solvent Tanker Corporation of Staten Island, New York, and renamed Yankee. She later was sold again, to Eklof Marine Corporation of Staten Island.
