= Wacouta I =

Wacouta I (Shooter) (c. 1800–1858) was a leader of the Red Wing band of Mdewakanton Dakota during the time of United States expansion into his people's homeland.

== Accession to leadership ==
In spring 1829, Wacouta faced two challenges upon becoming leader of the Red Wing band of Mdewakanton Dakota. He needed to fend off challenges from rivals within his village and also find success in dealings with United States government officials.

On March 4, 1829, the death of Tatankamani (Walking Buffalo), a widely respected Mdewakanton chief, left a vacuum in the leadership of his band. Tatankamani, also known as Red Wing, was renowned for his bravery and was thought to be able to see the future through dreams.

Wacouta I seemed to be the person to replace Red Wing. Red Wing's surviving son had contracted a bone disease that left him unfit for leadership. Wacouta, as Red Wing's nephew and possible stepson, was next in line. In his early thirties, intelligent, strong, and imposing at six feet tall, he was backed by a majority in the band. Whites who encountered Wacouta as a young man and later as an elder spoke highly of him. Wacouta was not a war chief, however. Younger men led by Mahpiyamaza (Iron Cloud), a warrior more in the mold of Red Wing, questioned his friendships with whites and his leadership.

Despite Mahpiyamaza's questioning, by May 18, 1829, the Mdewakanton band elected Wacouta as leader. The new chief signed the Second Treaty of Prairie du Chien on July 15, 1830. However, clashes between the two factions continued and in 1832 the Red Wing band split into two groups led by Wacouta and Mahpiyamaza. They moved downriver from the village of Red Wing to separate camps near Wabasha's village. Wabasha was a well-respected Dakota leader. He and his 500 followers made up the largest of the five Mdewakanton communities.

== Diplomacy with the United States ==
Wacouta continued to lead the remaining members of his group. In 1837, along with Mahpiyamaza and other prominent Dakota, traveled to Washington, D.C. At the U.S. capital, the Dakota were pressured and eventually agreed to give up lands east of the Mississippi River for annual cash payments. Some of the money was to be used for "education and civilization", which became a point of contention for the Dakota. Further, as part of the treaty, the U.S. government planned to recruit farmers, missionaries, and teachers to work with the Indians.

In 1838, Wacouta and Mahpiyamaza brought their two factions back to Red Wing where they continued to live separately due to ongoing tensions. A series of missionaries, including Samuel and Persis Dentan, John and Nancy Aiton, and Joseph and Maria Hancock, were sent to work with the Red Wing band beginning in the late 1830s.

In 1851 a U.S. delegation led by Luke Lea, Commissioner of Indian Affairs and Alexander Ramsey, Minnesota's territorial governor, asked to meet with regional Dakota leaders. They wished to purchase the vast lands belonging to the Dakota. In July, the delegation signed an agreement with Sisseton and Wahpeton Dakota known as the Treaty of Traverse des Sioux. The United States still needed the approval of the eastern Dakota, however.

Wacouta I, along with Wabasha III and Taoyateduta (Little Crow III), all experienced leaders of the Mdewakanton, agreed to confer with Lea and Ramsey in Mendota, Minnesota. Mahpiyamaza was also part of the delegation.

He and his band talked openly of opposing any treaty that would cost them their homes and village. Other young Mdewakanton men reportedly threatened to kill the first man to sign such an agreement. Wacouta addressed the assembly and spoke bitterly about his 1837 trip to Washington, D.C. He claimed the whites deceived the Indian leaders. Wacouta feared more treachery. Wapasha III and Taoyateduta also spoke of broken promises. The talks with the U.S. representatives nearly broke down.

Despite his concerns, Wacouta, along with other senior Mdewakanton chiefs, had traveled across the United States. They understood the power of the flourishing new nation in a way the younger men did not. Grudgingly, the Indian leaders agreed to the land purchase offer. Wacouta and his band left Red Wing in 1853, heading to a small Minnesota River Valley reservation near present-day Morton, Minnesota. Wacouta died in their new home five years later.
