= Tatankamani =

Dakota chief known as Red Wing II

Red Wing II (c. 1755–1829), also known as Tatankamani (French: Le Boeuf qui Marche, lit. 'Walking Buffalo') was a leader of the Mdewakanton Dakota in the upper Mississippi Valley. During the War of 1812, Chief Red Wing II initially supported the British together with other Dakota chiefs, but switched sides to support the Americans in 1814. His village was at Barn Bluff in present-day Red Wing, Minnesota.

== Early life ==
Tatankamani was born in the mid-18th century. His father, the original Chief Red Wing, took part in Pontiac's War. It is likely his Mantanton band, a sub-group of the Mdewakanton, lived for a time near the mouth of the Minnesota River. He succeeded his father as chief around 1806.

As a young man, Tatankamani displayed great skill in hunting and warfare. Followers believed he possessed supernatural power and the ability to foretell the future through dreams—an advantage that led him to many victories over tribal enemies. By the end of the 18th century, he had expanded his leadership beyond the Mantanton to a larger group of Mdewakanton.

== Relations with Americans and British ==
In August 1805, 26-year-old Lieutenant Zebulon Pike led the first United States expedition through the upper Mississippi region and met with seven Mdewakanton Dakota leaders. The Treaty of St. Peters, also known as Pike's Purchase, was signed by only two of the seven Dakota representatives present on September 23, 1805. The treaty granted approximately 100,000 acres of land to the United States for the purpose of building a fort at the mouth of the Minnesota River. Le Boeuf qui Marche (Tatankamani) was present, but did not sign the treaty.

War broke out between the United States and Great Britain in 1812, creating a problem for Tatankamani. The Mdewakanton fighter and his followers had earlier been British allies. To sort out matters, he sent his eldest son to join other Dakota leaders in Washington D.C., where they conferred with the U.S. Secretary of War. Red Wing, meanwhile, joined other leaders and met with Great Britain's representative, and the Mdewakanton agreed to fight for the British.

Tatanka Mani is believed to have led a unit of Dakota soldiers to Mackinac Island in Michigan, helping to gain a bloodless victory over the Americans there. Upon returning home, however, he listened to his son's stories of the United States' power. By February 1814, the Red Wing Mdewakanton had decided to offer support to the Americans. A letter from British trader Robert Dickson confirms the defection.

At war's end, the victorious United States invited chiefs Red Wing II, Bad Hail, Penichon, White Dog and others to a meeting in St. Louis. On July 19, 1815, he "touched a pen" to the treaty as "Tatangamanee, Walking Buffalo," a representative of the "Sioux (Dakota) of the Lakes," together with Iron Cloud and Marching Wind, also from the Red Wing band.

== Later life ==
During the war, Tatanka Mani had moved his village south, to the foot of He Mni Caŋ in present-day downtown Red Wing, Minnesota. The 300-foot-high riverside promontory was a well known landmark. Growing numbers of whites traveling up the Mississippi stopped at the village, meeting and talking with the aging Mdewakanton leader. In 1825, he took part in important discussions with Ojibwe and United States leaders downriver at Prairie du Chien, Wisconsin.

Tatanka Mani died on March 4, 1829, and was succeeded by Wacouta I, his nephew or stepson.
