= Wapasha II =

Mdewakanton Dakota leader (c.1773–1836)

Wapasha (The Leaf)
- Mdewakanton Dakota chief
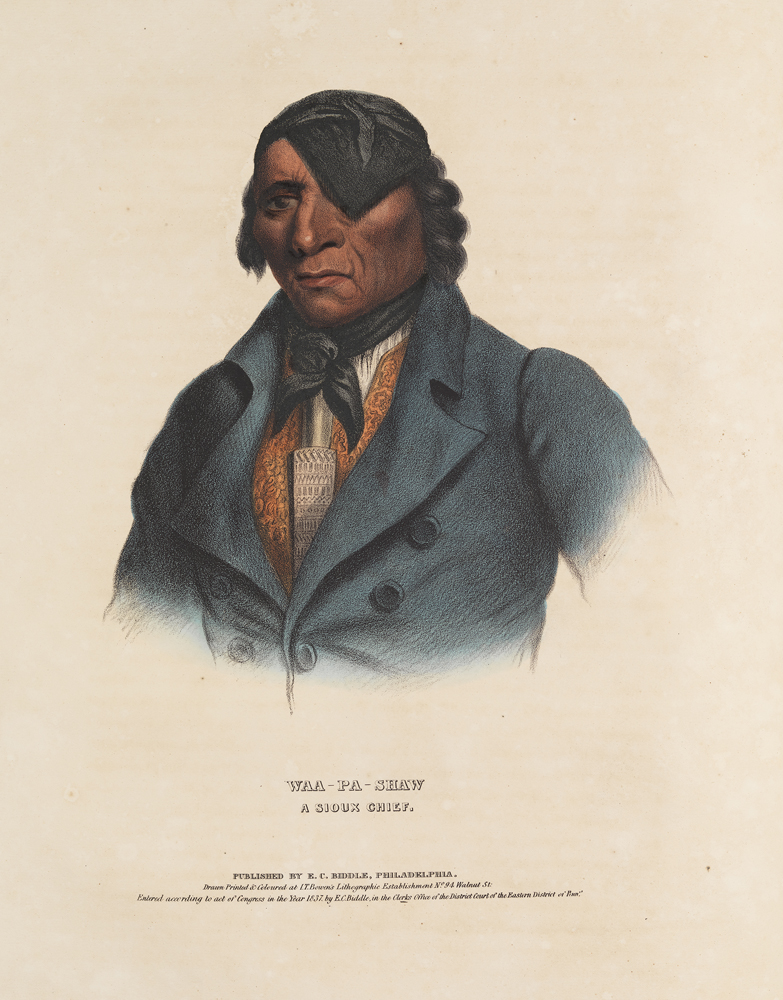
- Lithograph of Chief Wabasha II
- Born: ca. 1773
- Died: ca. 1836

Wabasha II (c. 1773–1836), also known as Wapahasha, Wapasha, or "The Leaf," succeeded his father as head chief of the Mdewakanton Dakota tribe in the early 1800s. He led the Dakota forces fighting with the British in the War of 1812, but sided with the United States in the Black Hawk War of 1832. Chief Wabasha II signed the Treaties of Prairie du Chien in 1825 and 1830.

In 1843, the settlers of Rocque's Landing changed the name of their town to "Wabasha" in honor of the chief. A statue of Wapahasha II stands next to a fountain in present-day Wabasha, Minnesota, on the west bank of the Mississippi River.

== Changes among the Dakota ==
For a time in the late 1700s, the Mdewakanton Dakota were said to have united into a large village called Titankatanni (meaning "great old village") on the lower Minnesota River, with as many as 400 lodges. By 1805, however, Titankatanni had split up due to the decline in the local population of game for hunting. The old Mantanton, Watpaton and Issati bands had dissolved, and five new Mdewakanton bands had formed and spread out geographically.

Chief Wabasha II led an offshoot of the Mantantons which called itself the Kiyuksa (Keoxa) band. In the early 1800s, the Kiyuksa band migrated periodically between the mouth of the upper Iowa River and Lake Pepin, and hunted on both sides of the upper Mississippi River. By 1830, the Kiyuksa band under Chief Wabasha grew to be over twice as large as any other Mdewakanton band.

=== Family and kinship ties ===
Wabasha had kinship ties to French Canadian fur trader Joseph Rolette, who married his niece, Marguerite Dubois, in 1807. He regularly stepped in to assist Rolette when there was trouble with hunters in his band, or when Rolette's clerks faced competition. In turn, Rolette probably advised Wabasha on issues such as the War of 1812, in which they both fought for the British, and relations with the Americans.

Another prominent fur trader with kinship ties to Wabasha was Augustin Rocque, whose parents were French Canadian voyageur Joseph Rocque and one of Wabasha's sisters.

== Early encounters with Americans ==
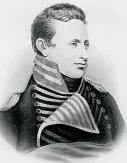
Explorer Zebulon Pike visited Chief Wabasha in 1805 and again in 1806.

=== Pike expedition ===
In the fall of 1805, Lieutenant Zebulon Pike stopped at the mouth of the Upper Iowa River to meet with Chief Wabasha, "son of the great Wapashaw," before proceeding north on his first expedition. On September 23, 1805, he held a council with seven Mdewakanton "chiefs" to negotiate the purchase of 100,000 acres of land so that the United States could build a fort at the mouth of the Minnesota River. The Treaty of St. Peters, also known as Pike's Purchase, was signed by only two of the seven Mdewakanton leaders present, including Chief Little Crow I and Penichon.

In April 1806, after spending the winter with the Ojibwe and with fur traders in the north, Pike returned to the mouth of the Minnesota River (to what is now known as Pike Island) and held another council with the Dakota. This time, more than forty chiefs from the Sisseton, Wahpeton and Mdewakanton Dakota bands attended, together with 500 tribesmen. The Ojibwe had refused to attend the proposed peace council organized by Pike, and had sent him away with pipes, which the Dakota chiefs accepted and smoked. However, a few Dakota objected to reconciliation with the Ojibwe, and Pike was unable to convince any Dakota leaders to accompany him to St. Louis for further talks as he had hoped.

Following the council, Pike went downriver and stopped in Kaposia, and again in the villages of Tatankamani and Wabasha, on his way back to St. Louis.

=== Delegation to St. Louis ===
In May 1806, a large party of Dakota men including four chiefs went down the Mississippi River to St. Louis to meet with General James Wilkinson. Soon afterward, Lieutenant Pike was sent on an expedition to Mexico and General Wilkinson left St. Louis abruptly due to his involvement in the Aaron Burr conspiracy, leaving further diplomatic relations with the Dakota to fall to others.

== War of 1812 ==
British fur trader Robert Dickson was an officer in the War of 1812 and used his ties to Chief Wabasha to gain support from the Dakota.

Chief Wabasha II led Dakota forces fighting for the British in the War of 1812. The Dakota, like many other Native American tribes, rallied against the Americans with "near unanimity"; Pike's efforts to establish American sovereignty over them had clearly failed.

=== Support for the British ===
Even before the outbreak of war, British fur trader Robert Dickson had called a council of 300 representatives of various tribes. Mdewakanton chiefs Wabasha II and Little Crow I were among those who made speeches in favor of standing by the English. Wabasha stated that the English traders had "always assisted us, and never more so than this year, at the risk of their lives," whereas the promises made by Americans were "not the songs of truth."

The Americans had failed to build the fort and trading post that Pike had promised in 1805. Meanwhile, in the winter of 1811–12, Robert Dickson had distributed nearly £2,000 in goods to the Dakota, who had suffered a particularly tough winter. The British fur traders had also suggested the possibility of establishing a permanent Indian nation, closed to settlers, that would serve as a buffer between Canada and the United States.

=== Leadership in battle ===
Robert Dickson and other traders with the North West Company were commissioned as British army officers, and Wabasha II and Little Crow I were both named generals of the Indian forces. The British forces led by Captain Charles Roberts together with over 400 Indians assembled by Robert Dickson quickly captured Fort Mackinac in July 1812. In the winter of 1812–13, most British allies stayed near Green Bay and Mackinac Island, but the Mdewakanton forces now led by Chief Wabasha II went west for the winter hunt.

In February 1813, Chief Wabasha II received orders to report in at Prairie du Chien with his men. A total of 97 Dakota warriors fought in the campaigns near Detroit that summer. They took part in the unsuccessful Siege of Fort Meigs and Battle of Fort Stephenson near Lake Erie in 1813.

=== Discontent among Dakota warriors ===
The failure of the British to take the forts was discouraging to many Dakota warriors, who also complained that they had received very little in return for their service. In the fall of 1813, Colonel Robert Dickson was unable to deliver supplies to the west, testing the patience of even Wabasha. When his tribesmen complained about the lack of guns, ammunitions and lead, Chief Wabasha took out the medals and flags he had received from the Americans to show that he could wield influence with them if needed.

In February 1814, Colonel Dickson finally arrived on the upper Mississippi River with five canoes filled with supplies. Wabasha thanked Dickson for the goods, but it was too little too late for many of the disaffected fighters.

During the Siege of Prairie du Chien in the summer of 1814, Wabasha's men stood by the British but did not get involved in the fighting. After the Americans surrendered Fort Shelby, the Mdewakanton warriors spent most of their energy protecting the defeated U.S. troops from the Ho-Chunks (Winnebagos) who seemed intent on attacking them.

Over the winter of 1814–15, the British maintained the garrison at Prairie du Chien, mainly to ensure that the Native Americans remained neutral. Chief Wabasha continued to support the British outwardly but the commander was aware that he regularly received visits from tribes sympathetic to the Americans, including the Yanktons and Wahpekutes. Nevertheless, the British regarded Wabasha as the key to controlling the region and continued to placate him with supplies from the garrison, often at the expense of others.

=== Council on Drummond Island ===
Following the signing of the Treaty of Ghent between the United States and the United Kingdom in 1815, the Indians felt that they had been betrayed and "sold out" by the British. The Canadian fur traders were also shocked to learn that they had gained no new territory; the border between Canada and the United States was remaining the same as before the War of 1812.

In 1816, the British held a council of western Indians on Drummond Island, 50 miles (80 km) east of the Straits of Mackinac. They praised the Sioux for their valor during the War of 1812 and offered gifts of blankets, knives and food provisions. Wabasha II and Little Crow I rejected their gifts and made speeches expressing anger at the British for failing to protect the interests of the Indians. At the meeting, Chief Wabasha said to Lieutenant Colonel Robert McDouall (through a translator):

"We never knew of this peace. We are told it was made by our Great Father...that it is your duty to obey his orders. What is that to us? Will these presents pay for the men we have lost in battle?...Will they make good your promises?”

As a result, McDouall wrote many letters to his superiors arguing in favor of British intervention against the military outposts that the United States was planning to build in Green Bay and Prairie du Chien. The Indians considered this an intrusion on their territory; they had never given permission for the Americans to build forts there. McDouall argued that the forts would be in violation of the Treaty of Ghent and that the British risked losing support from the Indians if they failed to stand up to the Americans.

=== Ambivalence toward Americans ===
While the British held their council on Drummond Island, American treaty commissioners met with a group of eastern Sioux near St. Louis. More than forty Dakotas, including nearly ten chiefs and headmen, "touched a pen" to an 1816 accord pledging peace and reaffirming all previous agreements with the United States including Pike's 1805 treaty. The Mdewakanton chiefs who signed included Bad Hail and Penichon from the Minnesota River bands; Red Wing II, Iron Cloud and Marching Wind from the Red Wing band, which had switched sides to support the Americans during the war; and White Dog, second chief from Wabasha's village.

On their way back from Drummond Island, Wabasha and Little Crow were traveling with their men down the Wisconsin River toward Prairie du Chien, when they were stopped by the new American commanding officer, Brevet Brigadier General Thomas A. Smith. Chief Wabasha explained that they intended to join their tribesmen who had pitched their tents above the town, at a location traditionally reserved for the Dakota, after returning from St. Louis. General Smith insisted that only the Dakota who had made peace with the Americans in St. Louis were allowed to camp north of the town, and launched a gunboat in a show of force that made Wabasha's men very unhappy. Nevertheless, Wabasha and Little Crow secured permission to visit and confer with their relatives.

The following morning, Wabasha and Little Crow gave up their British flags and medals and pledged to protect "their American father." They then reapproached Prairie du Chien by river, this time with American flags flying from the bows of their canoes, and were greeted with a celebration. General Smith wrote that he was satisfied that Chief Wabasha, a leader with "dignity and superior understanding," had been won over to support the Americans, observing that Wapasha had led his men in "shaking the flags with much zeal."

Indian superintendent William Clark, however, was not convinced. He was aware that Robert Dickson had begun building a stockade between Big Stone Lake and Lake Traverse, and was suspicious of his intentions. Clark then hired Benjamin O'Fallon as Indian agent to the eastern Sioux with orders to spy on Dickson's movements.

== Other American expeditions ==
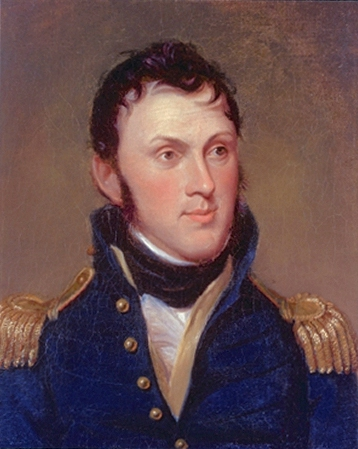
American Major Stephen Harriman Long met with Chief Wabasha II during his second expedition.

=== First Long expedition ===
In 1816, the United States Department of War planned to establish a system of military outposts in the region. In July 1817, Major Stephen Harriman Long was sent on an expedition to further explore the land acquired by Pike in 1805. On July 12, 1817, Long reached Wabasha's village which was then located on the Prairie aux Ailes in present-day Winona, Minnesota. Long found the village mostly deserted due to a hunting expedition and wrote:

The name of their chief is Wauppaushaw, or the Leaf, commonly called by a name of the same import in French La Feuille, or La Fye, as it is pronounced in English. He is considered one of the most honest & honourable of any of the Indians and endeavours to inculcate into the minds of his people the sentiments & principles adopted by himself. He was not at home at the time I called & I had no opportunity of seeing him.

The next day, Long reported meeting "the nephew of La Fieulle" [sic], whom he was told would succeed Wabasha as chief. Wabasha's nephew was out on a hunting expedition.

=== Visits with O'Fallon ===
In the fall of 1817, several Sioux leaders including Wabasha and Shakopee took turns visiting Indian agent Benjamin O'Fallon in Prairie du Chien. Chief Wabasha II was said to show "strong friendship" to the Americans, mentioning the "lies" the British had used to "shut our ears against truth." Chief Shakopee I went as far as to ask O'Fallon to visit his village to bring presents, and drag away the British traders who were corrupting his young men. On each of those occasions, O'Fallon smoked with the chiefs and promised to send American traders to take care of their needs.

In the spring of 1818, O'Fallon arrived on the Upper Mississippi with fifty infantrymen on two keelboats and stopped at every Mdewakanton village on the way, impressing many. At Wabasha's village, however, he received a mixed reception. Although Chief Wabasha embraced O'Fallon warmly, others in his camp were less friendly. When O'Fallon sat down in a council with seventeen village elders, ten of them refused to shake hands and promptly left. Wabasha explained that some of the elders "had not yet become reconciled with the big knives [Americans] and view them with indifference." After all, he explained, the Americans still had not delivered on the promises they had made more than ten years earlier. Wabasha reassured O'Fallon that he would not tolerate rude behavior if it continued, but also pointed out the transgressions of O'Fallon's own men. For example, several loggers from the fort at Prairie du Chien had taken lumber from their lands without permission.

=== Forsyth expedition ===
In the summer of 1819, Major Thomas Forsyth, an experienced Indian agent, was sent from St. Louis with provisions for the future Fort Snelling and US$2,000 worth of gifts for the Indians as late payment for the land cessions negotiated by Pike in 1805.

His first visit was to Wabasha's village. Forsyth met with Chief Wabasha to discuss the benefits of having a fort at the proposed site. He explained that the new fort would be a place where the Dakota could trade; it would offer certain services such as blacksmithing; and its proximity would discourage the Ojibwe from attacking the Dakota. In return, Forsyth asked for safe passage of American vessels and restraint in intertribal warfare. Finally, he said that the President of the United States was then at peace but was prepared for war, and warned them against being led astray by the British "bad birds from the northern quarter" as they had been during the War of 1812.

In his journal, Forsyth was negative in his assessment of the upper Mississippi River valley, describing it as "a mountainous, broken, rocky and sterile country, not fit for either man or beast to live in." He was also highly critical of the Sioux, and blamed their "alteration" on the influence of "those whom we called civilized people."

However, he admired Chief Little Crow I, and was positive about Chief Wabasha II, whom he referred to as "Leaf." After offering him a gift of a blanket, a pipe of tobacco, and some powder, Forsyth described Wabasha's reaction:

He accepted of the presents with thanks, and, after sundown, he came aboard of my boat to visit me, and conversed on many subjects. This man is no beggar, nor does he drink, and perhaps I may say he is the only man in the Sioux nation of this description.

=== Second Long expedition ===
In 1823, geologist William H. Keating, naturalist Thomas Say, and topographer James Edward Calhoun joined Major Stephen Harriman Long on a scientific expedition to the Minnesota River, Red River, Lake Winnipeg, Lake of the Woods and Lake Superior. On June 29, 1823, Major Long, who was traveling in the advance party, reached Wabasha's village first. Long was only able to hold a short conversation with the chief because of his interpreter. His initial impression of Chief Wabasha II was as follows:

The chief is about fifty years of age, but appears older; his prominent features are good and indicative of great acuteness and of a prying disposition; his stature is low; he has long been one of the most influential of the Dacota Indians, more perhaps from his talents in the counsel than his achievements in the field. He is represented as being a wise and prudent man, a forcible and impressive orator. His disposition to the Americans has generally been a friendly one, and his course of policy is well spoken of.

One hour later, Keating, who was traveling with Say and Calhoun, landed at Wabasha's village, learning that they had missed Major Long's party. Nevertheless, they were eager to meet Chief Wabasha because he was "held in such high esteem among the powerful and extensive nation of the Dacotas." Wabasha accepted the invitation to board their boat, but did not travel with them to Fort St. Anthony (which later became Fort Snelling). He explained that he had to remain at his village to watch over his band, due to the approach of Ojibwe warriors.

According to Keating, Chief Wabasha was interested in a wide range of subjects:

Wapasha spoke of the advantages of the arts and agriculture; of his wish to see them introduced; he expressed his desire to accept the invitation, given him by the Indian agent, to accompany him to the seat of government, as he was anxious to see how every thing was managed among white men. One of the objects which he spoke with the greatest rapture was the steamboat, which had ascended the river in the spring, and which he considered a wonderful invention. We were told that when this boat had come up, he was taken on board, and the machine was exhibited to him; he appeared to take great interest in the explanations of it, which were given to him.

He also explained the ongoing conflict between the Ojibwe (Chippewa) and the Dakota, and reminded them of past promises:

Wapasha informed the gentlemen in the boat, that the Chippewa Indians had been very troublesome, frequently descending the river that bears their name, and cutting off small parties of the Dacotas that were hunting. He spoke also of the advantages of having a mill built at the rapids of Chippewa river, as had been promised to them by the American government.

== Treaties ==
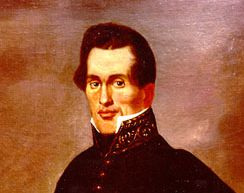
Indian agent Lawrence Taliaferro organized the first Dakota Sioux delegation to Washington in 1824.

In the spring of 1824, Chief Wabasha II departed Kiyuksa village as part of the "first Sioux Indian delegation to Washington" organized by Indian agent Lawrence Taliaferro. Other notable Dakota leaders in the delegation included Mdewakanton Chief Little Crow I and Yanktonai Chief Wanata I (The Charger). They were accompanied on the journey by a delegation of the Ojibwe (Chippewa). Agent Taliaferro had arranged the visit as part of his efforts to end warfare between the Sioux and the Chippewa, as well as between the Sioux and the Sac and Foxes.

The party traveled in keelboats from Fort Snelling to Prairie du Chien. Upon reaching Prairie du Chien, Wabasha and Wanata said they wanted to turn back, after speaking to traders who warned that they would get sick and die if they went further. Little Crow stated that he intended to continue to Washington with Taliaferro. Historians have offered differing interpretations of Taliaferro's account of the journey. Some imply that Wabasha and Wanata went no further and did not proceed to Washington, while others suggest that they were persuaded by Little Crow to continue.

In Washington, the Native American delegations met with United States Secretary of War John C. Calhoun and President James Monroe. The stage was set for the treaty negotiations at Prairie du Chien the following year.

=== 1825 Treaty of Prairie du Chien ===
On August 19, 1825, leaders of the Native American tribes of the Upper Mississippi assembled at Prairie du Chien. The chiefs and headmen in attendance represented tribes including the Dakota Sioux, the Ojibwe, the Sauk and Meskwaki (Fox), the Menomonee, the Iowa, the Ho-Chunk (Winnebago), and the Odawa. The United States treaty commissioners included Governor William Clark of Missouri Territory and Governor Lewis Cass of Michigan Territory.

After protracted discussions, boundaries were finally agreed between the Dakota and Ojibwe tribes. In addition, the first article of the treaty stated, "There shall be a firm and perpetual peace between the Sioux and Chippewas; between the Sioux and the confederated tribes of Sacs and Foxes; and between the loways and the Sioux."

The Dakota signatories to the 1825 Treaty of Prairie du Chien included Chiefs Wabasha II, Little Crow I, Standing Buffalo, Sleepy Eye, Two Faces, Tasaugye (His Cane), Black Dog, Wanata (The Charger), Red Wing II, Shakopee I, Penichon and Eagle Head, and several other head soldiers and "principal men."

The treaty failed to achieve its goal of establishing a lasting intertribal peace. Within months, it became evident that neither the Dakota nor the Ojibwe were willing to be restricted by the boundaries established in the treaty, and the tribes quickly reverted back to their previous pattern of hostilities. The 1825 treaty did, however, have the effect of making it easier for the U.S. government to purchase specific tracts of land from Native American tribes in subsequent years.

=== 1830 Treaty of Prairie du Chien ===
In the summer of 1830, a second conference of the northwestern tribes was held at Prairie du Chien, with United States treaty commissioners William Clark, superintendent of Indian affairs based in St. Louis, and Colonel Willoughby Morgan of the 1st Infantry Regiment at Fort Crawford.

The main purpose of the treaty was to stop various tribes, including the Dakota (Sioux] and the Sauk and Meskwaki (Fox), from raiding each other's territories. The U.S. army pledged to end intertribal warfare, while the tribal representatives consented to the punishment of those who violated the peace. In practice, the army would find this difficult to enforce as hostilities continued, and no laws existed to try Indians who were accused of inciting violence.

The U.S. also pushed for land cession as part of the 1830 treaty. The Dakota ceded a twenty-mile-wide strip of land on their side of the 1825 border, and the Sac and Fox ceded a similar strip of land. The creation of this "neutral zone" by the U.S. government would only serve to aggravate tensions between them, as hunters from both sides were tempted to hunt there. However, the tribes also received compensation for the land cessions. An annuity of $2,000 a year would be paid to the Dakota in the form of money, merchandise or animals, at the chiefs' discretion, for a period of ten years.

The Dakota representatives who signed the 1830 Treaty of Prairie du Chien included 26 Mdewakantons, nine Wahpekutes, two Sissetons and no Wahpetons. Notable signatories included Chiefs Wabasha II, Little Crow I and Big Eagle (grandfather of the later Big Eagle), as well as Wacouta I (who had succeeded Red Wing II), Big Thunder (who would later become Little Crow II), and Good Road (successor of Penichon).

In subsequent years, Indian agent Lawrence Taliaferro used the $2,000 annuity to purchase goods which he divided three ways: to Tasaugye's Wahpekute band, to Wabasha's Mdewakantons, and to the Indians living near St. Peters Agency. While the annuities promised in the 1830 treaty were "too small to have much effect, good or bad, on the Santee Sioux," Taliaferro tried to use them to build support for his efforts, particularly as local fur traders under newcomer Henry Hastings Sibley became less willing to provide for their needs. The treaty annuities made the Mdewakanton leaders aware that the U.S. government could relieve the economic difficulties they were having due to the decline in game available for hunting.

The treaty had also promised a blacksmith, which became especially convenient for Wabasha's village. Wabasha briefly protested when he found out that the planned blacksmith shop would be located at St. Peters Agency – too far for his sizable band to benefit from the rat spears, hoes and metal traps it would produce. Agent Taliaferro eventually agreed to put the new blacksmith shop in Kettle Hills, just below Kiyuksa village.

Finally, the 1830 treaty set aside a tract of land for the "half-breed relations of the Medawa Kanton Sioux," encompassing 320,000 acres of land west of Lake Pepin. Referred to as the "Half-Breed" Tract, or as the Wabasha or Pepin Reservation, the land was set aside for the mixed-race relatives of the Dakota and would become a point of contention in the 1850s. Chief Wabasha is said to have agreed to discuss land cession only after the United States agreed that the Sioux could "give a small piece [of land] to our friends the half breeds." Wabasha's band owed considerable debt to "mixed-blood" fur trader Alexis Bailly, who was said to have influenced Wabasha's decision to push for this. Nevertheless, Taliaferro was satisfied that the treaty commissioners had resisted pressure from the American Fur Company to include an article within the treaty for their benefit.

== Black Hawk War ==
Chief Wabasha II and his band were recruited by the United States to fight against Chief Black Hawk and the "British band" of Sauks during the Black Hawk War of 1832.

=== Peace talks with the Meskwaki ===
On May 21, 1832, Chief Wabasha held peace talks with the Dubuque Meskwaki (Fox) in the presence of Colonel Willoughby Morgan at Prairie du Chien. The Dakota had complained that a war party of Sauks and Meskwakis had entered their territory as defined by the 1830 treaty and killed three or more of their men. The Meskwaki denied that anyone from their tribe had gone against the Dakota since signing the treaty, and said that they wished for peace. In doing so, they stipulated that they could only speak for themselves and not for other members of their brethren. The Dakota and Meskwaki "smoked and danced together and parted in apparent friendship and harmony" before returning home.

=== Recruitment and payment by Indian agents ===
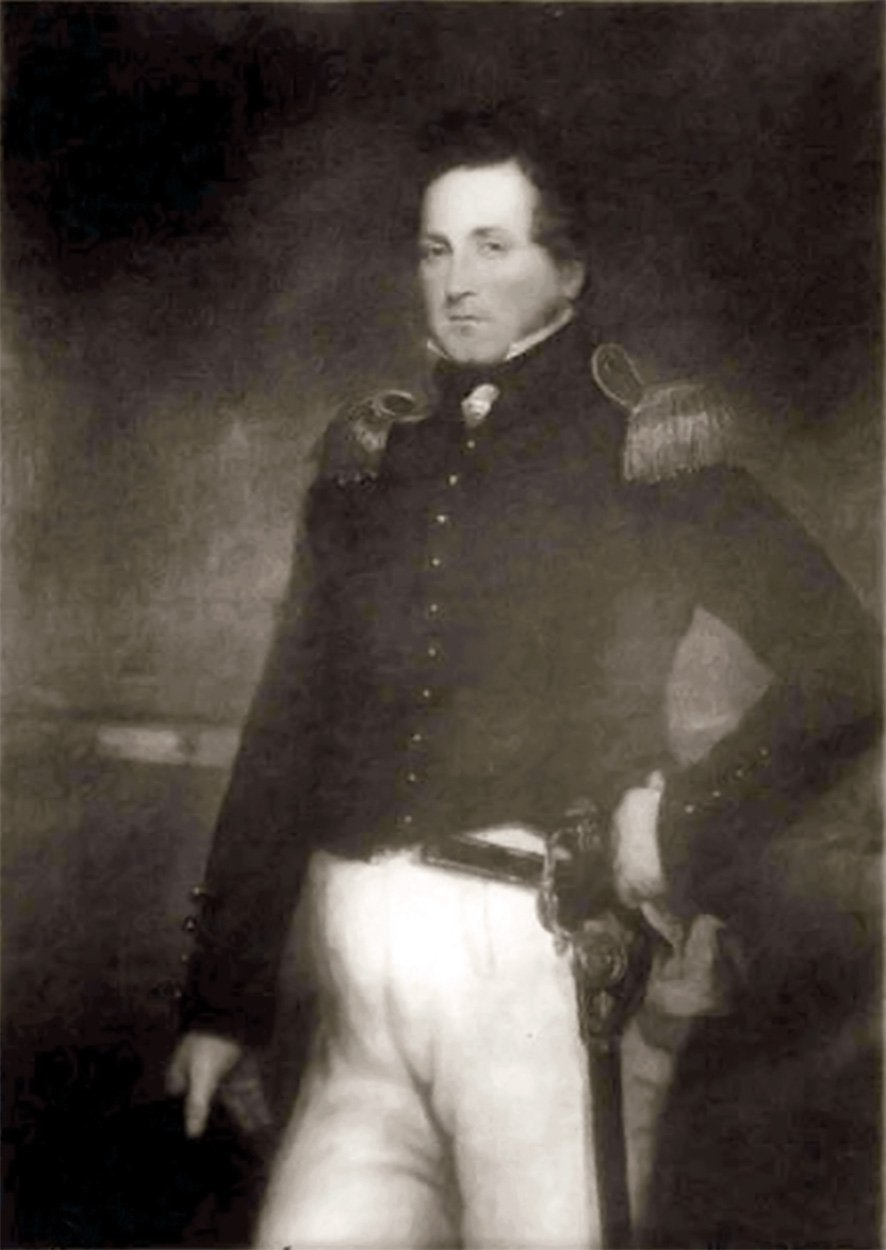
Brevet Brigadier General Henry Atkinson ordered the Dakotas to pursue the Sauks after the Battle of Bad Axe

Toward the end of May, after the United States declared war against Chief Black Hawk, Brevet Brigadier General Henry Atkinson sent a message from Dixon, Illinois to Prairie du Chien, instructing Indian agent Joseph M. Street to recruit the Sioux to fight with them. Street sent former Fort Snelling schoolteacher John Marsh and Indian sub-agent Thomas Burnett to speak to Chief Wabasha. They left Prairie du Chien by boat on May 30 and reached Wabasha's village on June 1. They found the Sioux "apparently anxious and fully prepared to go to war against their old enemies." Within six days, they returned to Prairie du Chien with 80 Sioux and 20 Winnebago warriors who were willing to fight with the U.S.; in the end, there were nearly 100 Dakota who joined.

Indian agent Street wrote to his counterpart Lawrence Taliaferro complaining that Taliaferro's Dakota were "a discontented people and hard to please." Street had argued with Chief Wabasha, French Crow and other headmen about the best way to distribute payment to the warriors. Wabasha and the other leaders wanted a lump sum, which they would divide up as they saw fit; Street insisted on paying each warrior individually, while admitting that his records were flawed.

=== Battle of Horseshoe Bend ===
Wabasha's men, led by head soldier The Bow (also known as "L'Arc" or "Lark"), were placed under the command of Colonel William S. Hamilton, together with a group of Menominees and Ho-Chunks (Winnebagos). On June 16, 1832, they arrived at the Pecatonica River battleground, one hour after the volunteer militia led by Colonel Henry Dodge had already killed and scalped the eleven Kickapoo warriors who had attacked them. Dodge reported to Atkinson that after the Battle of Horseshoe Bend, some of the scalps were shared with the "friendly" Indians who "appeared delighted with the scalps."

=== Desertions and reprimand ===
Following "a fortnight of inconspicuous service," the Dakota were marching with Colonel Hamilton to join General Atkinson's army in fighting Black Hawk's men, when all but six of them had a change of heart, turned around, and fled. Some returned home through Galena, Illinois, where they were held briefly as deserters; others went to Prairie du Chien, where they were met by Indian agent Street, who reprimanded them for their "cowardice". Street was reported as saying to The Bow and to the Sioux:

"I wish to know why you have left the army...I said to you: 'Go and be revenged of the murderers of your friends if you wish it. If you desire revenge you have permission to take it. I will furnish you arms, ammunition, and provisions, and here is the man who is sent to conduct you to the enemy. Follow him and he will lead you to the murderers of the Winnebagoes, the Menomonees, and the Sioux.' That is what I said to you. With one accord you desired to go to war, and appeared bent on full satisfaction for your wrongs and injuries. You raised the war song. Colonel Hamilton led you into the country infested by Sacs and Foxes, and when in striking distance of your enemy you mangled the dead bodies of eleven Sacs [sic] killed by the warriors of your Great Father the day before you arrived. Then you turned about and came back to this place. You have neither seen, nor made any effort to see the Sacs and Foxes...Answer me truly – Why have you returned and what do you mean to do?"

The Bow, who was half Dakota and half Ho-Chunk, replied that they intended to go home. He explained that the Sauk had begun to kill a great many white people, and that Colonel Dodge was brave but had too few men. The Dakota, he said, were unhappy with Colonel Hamilton, who had starved them and did not use the Indian warriors well. Furthermore, their feet were sore, their moccasins were worn out, and they missed their families. Street accused The Bow of lying and said that their conduct had been "most despicable":

"You have not hearts to look at the Indians who murdered your families and friends. Go home to your squaws and hoe corn, you are not fit to go to war. Your Great Father gives you some flour and pork to eat; you have no stomachs for war. Go home to your squaws and hoe corn, and never again trouble your Great Father with your anxiety to go to war. Take your canoes and clear yourselves."

With that, he sent the Dakota deserters home and reported to Taliaferro that he was confident at least in the determination of the Menominees for revenge.

=== Battle of Bad Axe ===
Despite the desertions, General Atkinson and Henry Dodge called for the assistance of the Dakota once again in bringing the war to a close. On August 1, 1832, Captain Joseph Throckmorton was sent with his steamboat, the Warrior, up to Wabasha's village to inform them that the Sauks were approaching the Mississippi and to come down at once. On his return trip, Captain Throckmorton learned that Black Hawk and the "British band" were at the mouth of the Bad Axe River, and was soon engaged in battle.

On August 2, Wabasha and his warriors arrived on the west bank of the river, after the Sauk had been well defeated. General Atkinson, who was on board the Warrior with Lieutenant Colonel Zachary Taylor and Captain Throckmorton on their way back to Prairie du Chien, immediately gave orders for the Sioux to pursue the remaining Sauks who were fleeing into the "neutral" Iowa country. The Dakota soon overtook the Sauks, who were too weak to continue fighting; they killed at least 68 in a single attack. Mixed-blood hunter Jack Frazer alone took seven scalps.

Black Hawk later denounced the Americans for sending the Sioux in pursuit of the Sauks, including women and children who had managed to escape. Once they had recovered from the devastating loss, the Sauks sought retribution, and raids continued back and forth with the Dakota for another decade.

== Death ==
Chief Wabasha II died during a smallpox epidemic in 1836 which killed many in his band. On September 10, 1836, Wabasha's band signed a treaty with Colonel Zachary Taylor, acting Indian agent at Prairie du Chien. The treaty relinquished any Sioux claim to present-day northwest Missouri for $400 and was signed not by Chief Wabasha II, but by his son who succeeded him as Chief Wabasha III.
