= White Pine Treaty =

1837 legal treaty

The 1837 Treaty of St. Peters, commonly referred to as the White Pine Treaty, was a treaty conducted between Governor Henry Dodge for the United States and representatives from Ojibwe bands located across today's Wisconsin and Minnesota. It was conducted on July 29, 1837, at St. Peters, Wisconsin Territory (known today as Mendota, Minnesota).

Through that treaty, Ojibwe people ceded much of the land that became northern Wisconsin, and a swath of land between the Mississippi and St Croix rivers in what is now Minnesota. This agreement is commonly referred to as the “White Pine Treaty,” because the territory opened up the region's vast white pine forests to logging.

In the treaty, the Ojibwe preserved their right to hunt, fish, and gather within the ceded territory. Those rights have been persistently obstructed by local governments and citizens. However, in 1983 and 1999 federal courts upheld the Ojibwe people’s usufructuary rights on the ceded land in Wisconsin and Minnesota, respectively, citing the 1837 treaty’s protections.

== Ojibwe territory before 1837 ==
Ojibwe territory pre-settler colonization

Before the colonization of the Americas, Ojibwe communities lived on a vast territory around the Upper Great Lakes and further West onto the plains of both the modern day US and Canada. In his 1851 history, Kah-Ge-Ga-Gah-Bowh described the lands of his people:

“Its eastern boundary was marked by the waters of Lakes Huron and Michigan. The mountain ridge, lying between Lake Superior and the frozen Bay, was its northern barrier. On the west, a forest, beyond which an almost boundless prairies. On the south, a valley, by Lake Superior, thence to the southern part of Michigan. The land within these boundaries has always been known as the country of the Ojibways.”

By the time that the US Government negotiated the White Pine Treaty with the Ojibwe, settler colonial expansion had fragmented and bounded their land along such lines as the US - Canadian border and prior treaty boundaries. Further land cession treaties would alter those boundaries throughout the 19th century.

The Ojibwe did not privatize land or treat it as an entity that could be owned prior to settler colonization. In fact, the Ojibwe language did not even have terms to describe property and ownership because that system had not been a part of their lives. Rather, when speaking of their relationships to the land, Ojibwe people sometimes say “Gakina Awiiya,” which roughly translates to “we are all related.” Ojibwe people prior to settler colonization considered themselves deeply responsible to the land and to living in balance with the plants, animals, and other natural things around them. The Ojibwe relationship to land was interrupted as settler colonists imported the notion of privatization and legal structures of property ownership to the land. As early settlers and explorers ventured West, some Ojibwe people became involved in the fur trade and other mercantile economies. At the turn of the 19th century Ojibwe communities still organized their lives around harvesting the resources that had supported their people for centuries. By the time the fur trade collapsed in the 1830s, many Ojibwe communities in what is now Minnesota and Wisconsin were also increasingly tied into the settler colonial trade economy and many people had acquired debt.

When they were approached by the US Government with the possibility to open some of their land up to industry in return for annuity payments, some Ojibwe bands seized the opportunity to support their emerging economies and help pay off debt from the fur trade. However, selling land into private ownership was not how many Native people present at the Treaty of St Peter’s understood the agreement. The Ojibwe who signed the 1837 treaty meant to open up their land to white settlement and harvest, not ownership, and understood the agreement to protect their rights to live, hunt, fish, and gather on the ceded land as well.

== 1837 Treaty Negotiation ==
The US Government negotiated the White Pine Treaty with the Ojibwe to open their land to logging. In particular, the land cession was negotiated to guarantee access to the Wisconsin Territory's lumber resources that was needed to help build housing for the growing populations in St. Louis, Missouri and Cleveland, Ohio. Beyond timber, the Secretary of War, Lewis Cass, also believed that this swath of land would eventually be fit for settlement as well. In the decades after the Treaty of St. Peter’s was signed, the timber industry moved into the region and became central to the economies of both Minnesota and Wisconsin. Ojibwe people and communities also participated in the logging economy.

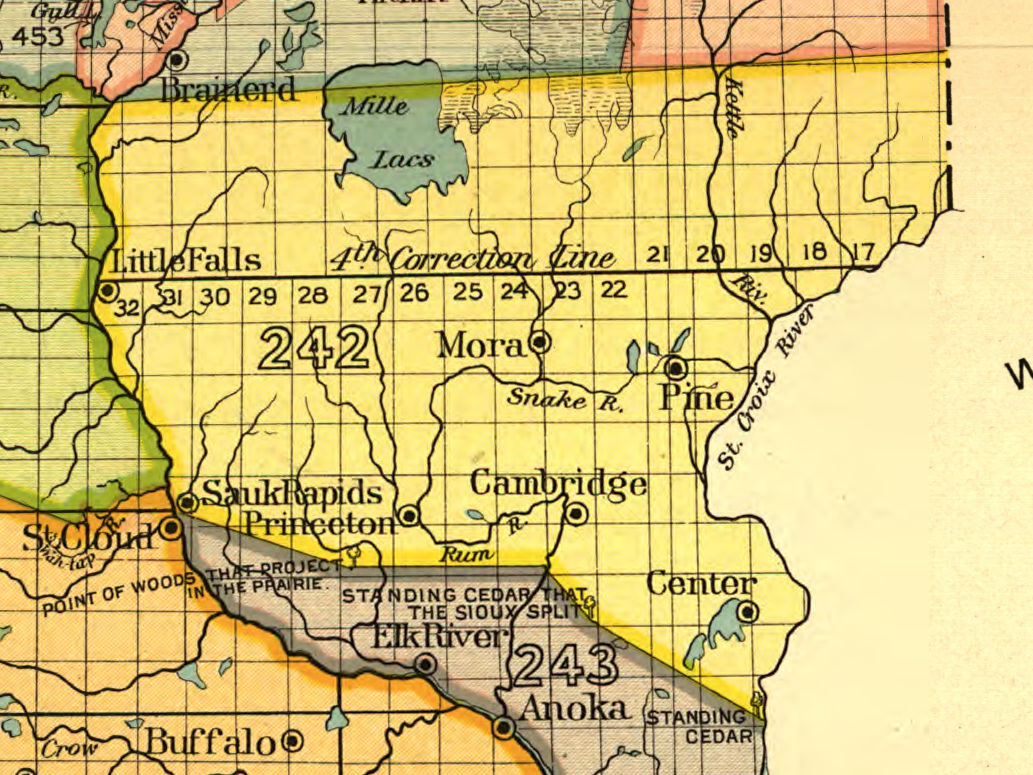
The Minnesota portion of the 1837 treaty territory

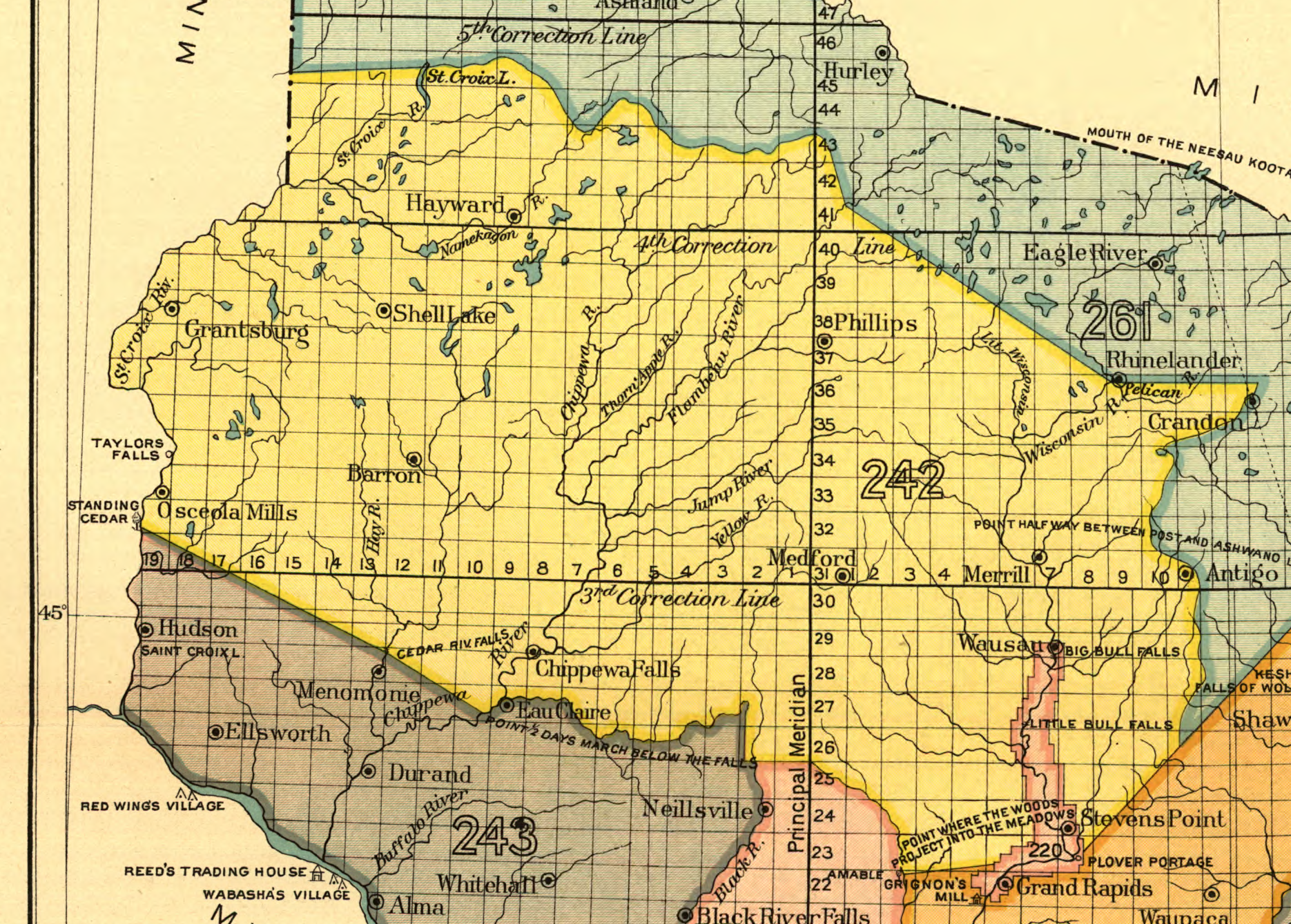
The Wisconsin portion of the 1837 treaty territory

Two men led the treaty delegation for the US: the Governor of the Wisconsin territory, Henry Dodge, and Verplanck Van Antwerp who would later serve as the Secretary to the Commissioner of Indian Affairs. These men set the meeting place at what was then called St. Peter’s, at Fort Snelling near the confluence of the Minnesota and Mississippi Rivers. Other US Government officials and interpreters were also present. Some of the American participants in the negotiations doubted the ability of the interpreters to provide accurate translations to the Ojibwe people present, and certainly differences in language challenged mutual understanding between all parties. More than 1,000 Ojibwe people from several bands traveled to the treaty negotiations in the summer of 1837. In the treaty, Henry Dodge referred to the diverse group of signatories as “The Chippewa Nation of Indians.” However, that was an inaccurate description of the many different groups that attended the meeting. In attendance were representatives from various Ojibwe bands with different political goals and material conditions. While many groups in attendance actually lived on the land being discussed, others traveled from outside the proposed treaty boundaries, some from as far away as Leech Lake. Esh-ke-bog-e-coshe, called “Flat Mouth” in English, tried to explain this to Dodge, saying,

“I am called a chief. I am not the chief of the whole nation, but only of my people or tribe. The residence of my band is outside of the country which you wish to buy from us. After the people who live in that country shall have told you their minds I will speak.”

In spite of the diversity among the groups represented, Dodge chose to characterize the Ojibwe in attendance as one political body. Erasing the diversity of groups present in that legal document led to strained relationships between the various bands for years to come as the implications of that treaty and others were negotiated and contested.

After weeks of negotiation and ceremony, representatives of several Ojibwe bands signed the White Pine Treaty ceding a large swath of land in what is now Minnesota and Wisconsin. The Ojibwe were also guaranteed the right to continue to use that land for their traditional practices and sustenance. Article V of the treaty reads, “The privilege of hunting, fishing, and gathering the wild rice, upon the lands, the rivers and the lakes included in the territory ceded, is guaranteed to the Indians, during the pleasure of the President of the United States.” The treaty did not include any agreement by the Ojibwe to leave that land or stop hunting, gathering, and harvesting on it. Rather, they ceded sole control of the region’s resources and allowed for immigration to it.

== Establishment of Reservations ==
Together with the 1842 and 1854 treaty-ceded territories in determining the locations of Indian Reservations in the 1854 Treaty of La Pointe and the 1855 Treaty of Washington, the 1837 treaty-ceded territory was divided into five zones. Charles Royce in his 1899 report and accompanying map to the United States Congress designated the territory as "Land Cession Area No. 242," thus the area is often called "Royce Area 242." The five zones each with proposed centralized Indian Reservations of approximately 60,000 acres (240 km^{2}) each were Mille Lacs Lake (242A), St. Croix (242B), Lac Courte Oreilles (242C), Lac du Flambeau (242D) and Mole Lake (242E), with access accommodations made for Fond du Lac, La Pointe and Lac Vieux Desert.

However, with St. Croix and Sokoagon walking out of the negotiations of the 1854 Treaty of La Pointe, they were excluded from further business, losing their federal recognition until 1934, and the proposed St. Croix Indian Reservation was never established in zone 242B and Mole Lake was never established straddling zone 242E and 1842 treaty-ceded territory. In the case of St. Croix, illness overcame the Chief Ayaabens and the United States would not accept a sub-Chief vested with negotiation authority, so St. Croix had no choice but to walk away; oral history of both the St. Croix Chippewa Indians of Minnesota of the Mille Lacs Band of Ojibwe and the St. Croix Chippewa Indians of Wisconsin both state if it were not for Chief Ayaabens’ illness, the St. Croix Band would have insisted on reaffirmation of treaty rights expressed in both the 1837 Treaty of St. Peters and the 1842 Treaty of La Pointe, so that the Band would not be face with loss of off-Reservation resources access. Shortly afterwards, Chief Ayaabens died from his illness. In the case of Mole Lake, their Chief was barred from the treaty council as the United States firmly believed that the initially proposed four Reservations of about 10,000 acres (40 km^{2}) each would not be an adequate alternative for a single Reservation of about 60,000 acres (240 km^{2}). The Mole Lake Chief sent his sub-Chief to the Treaty council, with full negotiation authority, but like St. Croix, United States would not accept Mole Lake's sub-Chief, even when fully vested with negotiation authority, leaving the Mole Lake delegation no other choice but to walk away from Treaty council. However, Mille Lacs Lake and Lac Courte Oreilles Indian Reservations were established in 242A and 242C respectively, and Lac du Flambeau Indian Reservations was established straddling zone 242D and 1842 treaty-ceded territory.

== Treaty Rights following 1837 ==
Although the Ojibwe were promised the right to gather natural resources on the 1837 treaty land, those rights have been persistently denied by the state governments of Minnesota and Wisconsin. Over the decades following the White Pine Treaty, both states passed laws regulating hunting, fishing, and gathering that disregarded the protection of those rights for the Ojibwe that were written into treaty law. Over the years, Ojibwe people have been cited and arrested for exercising their treaty rights to hunt or fish off of reservation lands.

Federal courts have upheld Ojibwe usufructuary rights in both Minnesota and Wisconsin. In 1974, two members of the Lac Court Oreilles Ojibwe band were arrested in Wisconsin for spearfishing on the 1837 treaty land. The band appealed that decision and the case reached the U.S. Court of Appeals for the Seventh Circuit. In Lac Court Oreilles Band of Chippewa Indians v. Lester P. Voigt, et al. that federal court ruled that the Ojibwe still had the right to hunt and fish on their ceded land. Similarly, in 1990 the Mille Lacs Band sued the state of Minnesota claiming that their treaty rights were being violated. In Minnesota v. Mille Lacs Band of Chippewa Indians, the Supreme Court ruled that the Ojibwe were still guaranteed the rights to hunt, fish, and gather that were outlined in the Treaty of St Peters.

Despite these federal rulings upholding them, there has been consistent debate about treaty rights in Minnesota and Wisconsin on the 1837 treaty land. Following the Lac Court Oreilles Band of Chippewa Indians v. Lester P. Voigt, et al. ruling in 1987, white recreational fishermen protested Ojibwe fishing practices in what has been called the Wisconsin Walleye War. Protestors claimed that the Ojibwe in Wisconsin had been given special privileges that would threaten the tourism industry in Northern Wisconsin, and often turned to violence to express their frustration.

Frustrations about Ojibwe fishing rights have persisted into the 21st century. Anglers in Minnesota believe that allowing Native people to harvest proportionately more fish than them is unequal and thus unfair. However, many Ojibwe people in both states continue to assert their sovereignty and rights to hunt, fish, and gather on treaty land. During the summer of 2020, Ojibwe bands in Minnesota held virtual events commemorating all the harm the US Government has caused by violating their sovereignty, as well as celebrating uplifting their rights to hunt and fish and practice lifeways that they’ve maintained over the centuries.

== Treaty area boundary adjustments ==
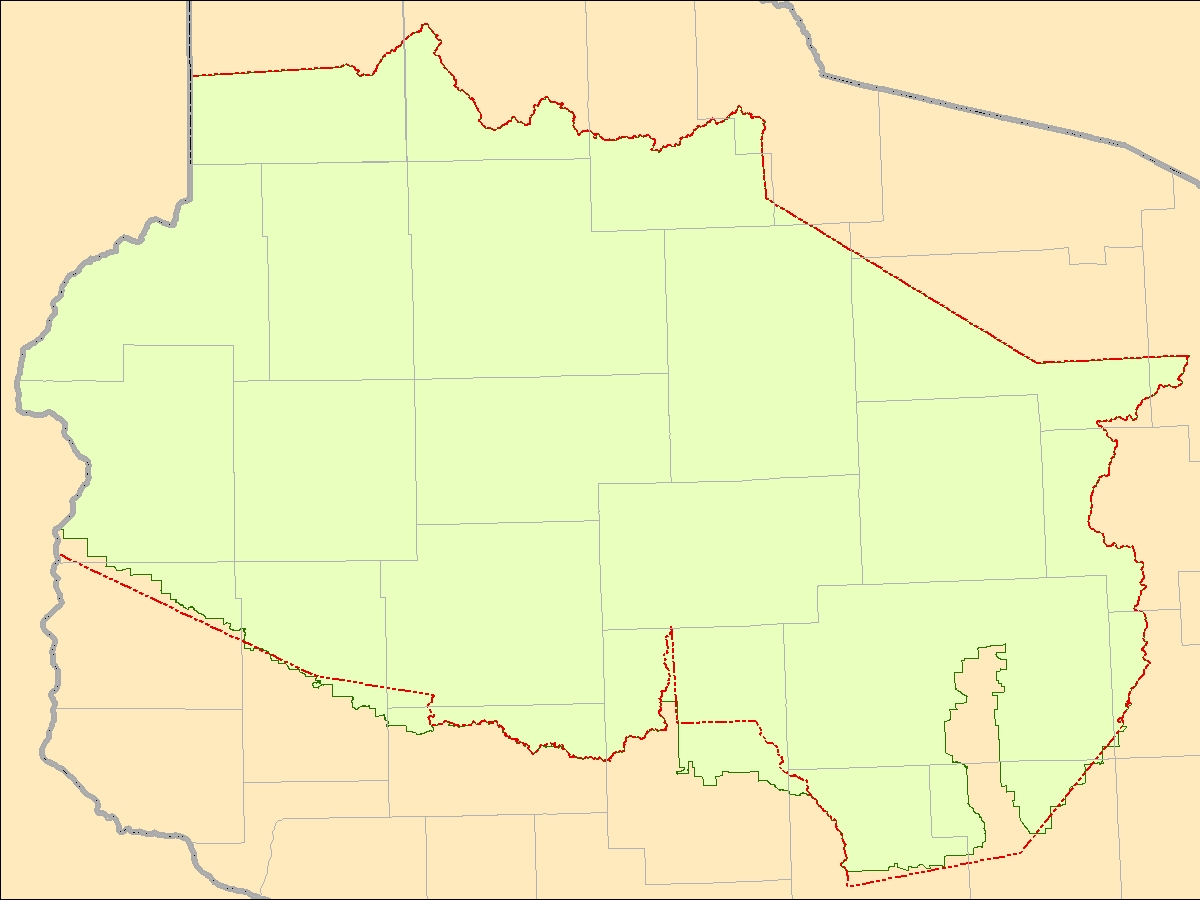
The Wisconsin portion of the treaty area showing the treaty boundary (in red) and the adjusted boundary (in green)

In Wisconsin, for regulatory purposes, the southern boundaries of the 1837 treaty-area have been adjusted to follow distinct landmarks such as roads and streams. However, in Wisconsin with consent of the property-owner and with tribally issued license, all treaty rights of hunting, fishing and gathering may be exercised by the members of the signatory bands.

In Minnesota, no boundary adjustments have been made. However, hunting is limited to public lands located within the 1837 treaty-area and requires tribally issued hunting license. For non-public lands within the 1837 treaty-area, hunting is subjectable to state hunting licensing and rules. For fishing and gathering, tribally issued licenses are required in Minnesota's portion of the 1837 treaty-ceded territory.
