= Sugar Loaf Brewery =

- U.S. National Register of Historic Places
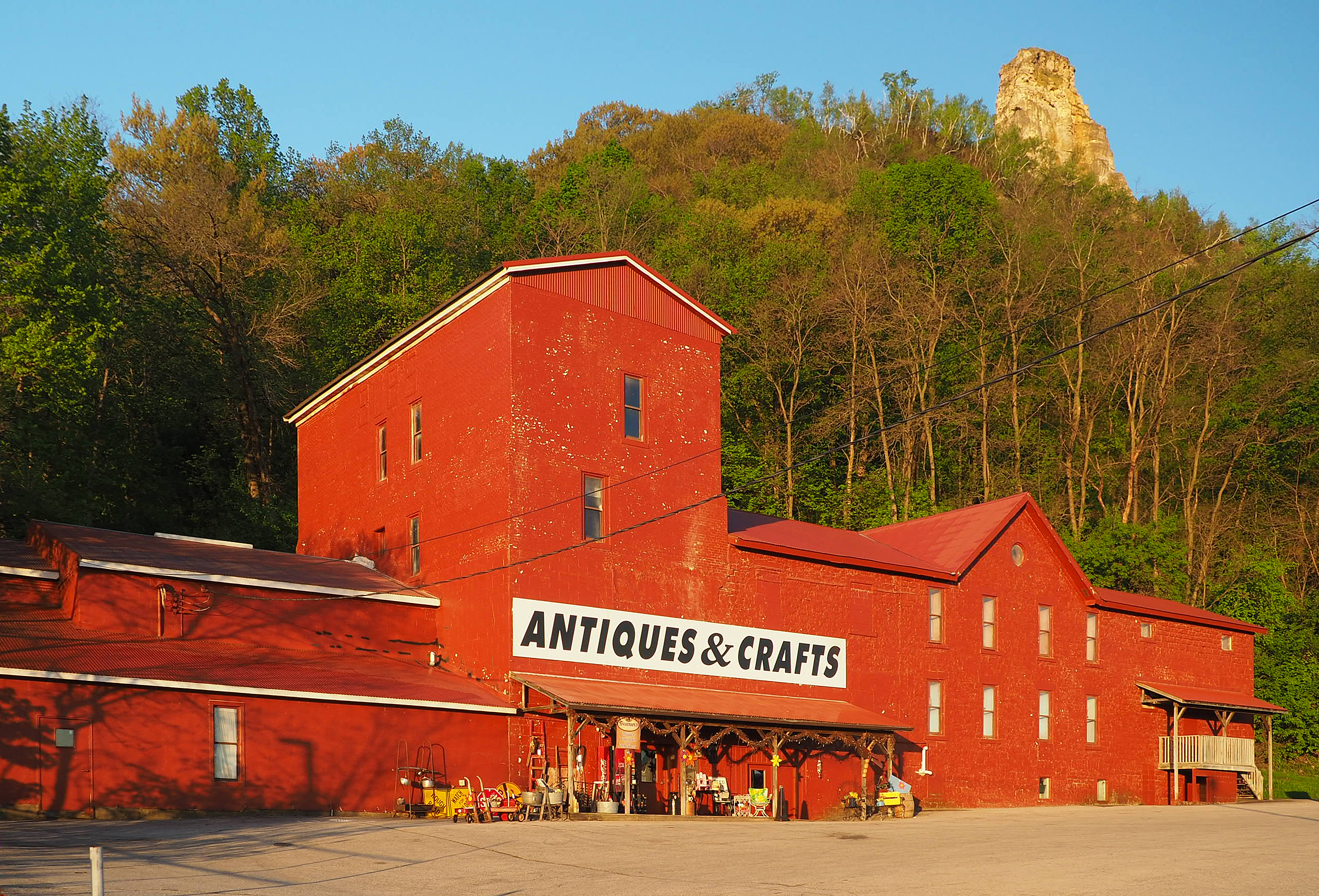
- Sugar Loaf Brewery viewed from the northeast

- Location within Minnesota Location within the United States
- Location: 1023 Sugar Loaf Road, Winona, Minnesota
- Coordinates: 44°1′44″N 91°37′27″W
- Area: 5.3 acres (2.1 ha)
- Built: 1872
- Built by: Peter Bub
- NRHP reference No.: 78001572
- Designated: March 31, 1978

Sugar Loaf Brewery or Bub's Brewery is a former brewery in Winona, Minnesota, United States. It was established in 1862 at the foot of Sugar Loaf, the prominent river bluff from which it took its name. The extant brewery complex, which includes storage caves dug into the bluff, dates from 1872 when the original building was destroyed by fire and a replacement built. The brewery was listed on the National Register of Historic Places in 1978 for its local significance in the theme of industry. It was nominated for its association with prominent local brewer Peter Bub (d. 1911) and his successors, who produced beer on the site until 1969.

The building has been converted into an antique mall, Treasures Under Sugar Loaf.

== See also ==
- National Register of Historic Places listings in Winona County, Minnesota
- List of defunct breweries in the United States
