= Wapasha =

Wapasha may refer to:

People

- A succession of Mdewakanton Sioux chiefs
  - Wapasha I (1718-1806)
  - Wapasha II (c.1773–1836)
  - Wabasha III (1816-1876), also known as Joseph Wabasha
  - Wabasha IV, also known as Napoleon Wabasha

Ships

- USS Wapasha (YN-45), later YNT-13, later YTB-737, a United States Navy net tender, later large harbor tug, in service from 1941 to 1947
