= Sugar Loaf (Winona, Minnesota) =

Bluff in Winona, Minnesota, United States

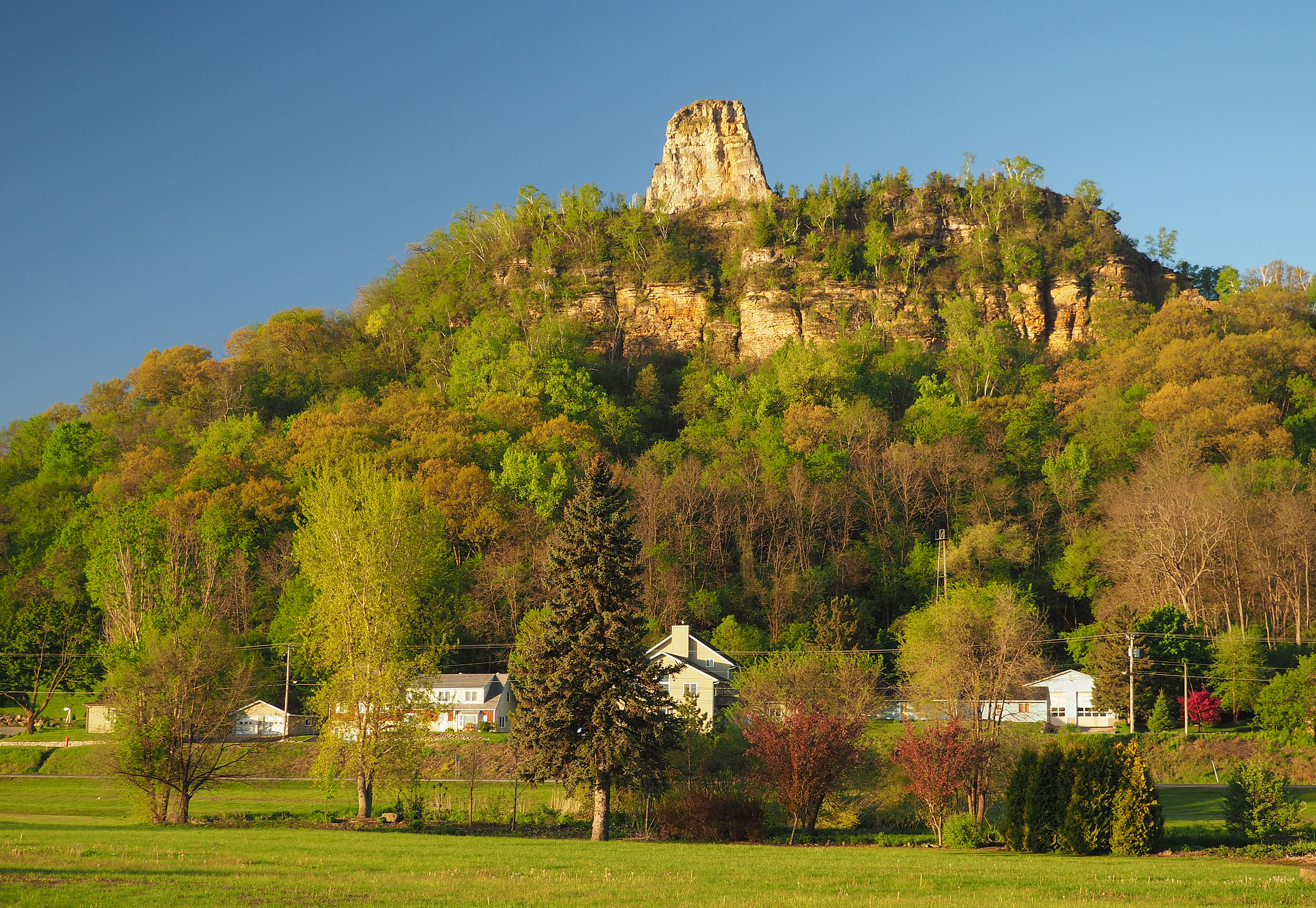
- Sugar Loaf bluff

Highest point
- Elevation: 1,214 ft (370 m)
- Coordinates: 44°1′42″N 91°37′36″W

Geography
- Location within Minnesota
- Location: Winona, Minnesota, United States

Geology
- Mountain type: River bluff
- Sugar Loaf
- U.S. National Register of Historic Places
- Location: Southwest of U.S. Highway 61 and Minnesota State Highway 43, Winona, Minnesota
- Area: 18 acres (7.3 ha)
- NRHP reference No.: 90001164
- Added to NRHP: August 3, 1990

Sugar Loaf is a bluff on the Mississippi River topped by a rock pinnacle, overlooking the city of Winona, Minnesota, United States. The name "Sugar Loaf" is sometimes taken to mean just the rock pinnacle, which was created by quarrying in the 19th century. The bluff stands above the junction of U.S. Route 61 and State Highway 43. It towers 500 feet (150 m) over Lake Winona (a former part of the Mississippi River's main channel), and the pinnacle rises more than 85 feet (26 m) above the remainder of the bluff.

Sugar Loaf was listed on the National Register of Historic Places in 1990 for having local significance in the theme of entertainment/recreation. It was nominated for being one of Minnesota's most famous landmarks to early travelers and tourists; a popular subject for stereoscope images, travel literature, and folklore.

== Rock pinnacle ==
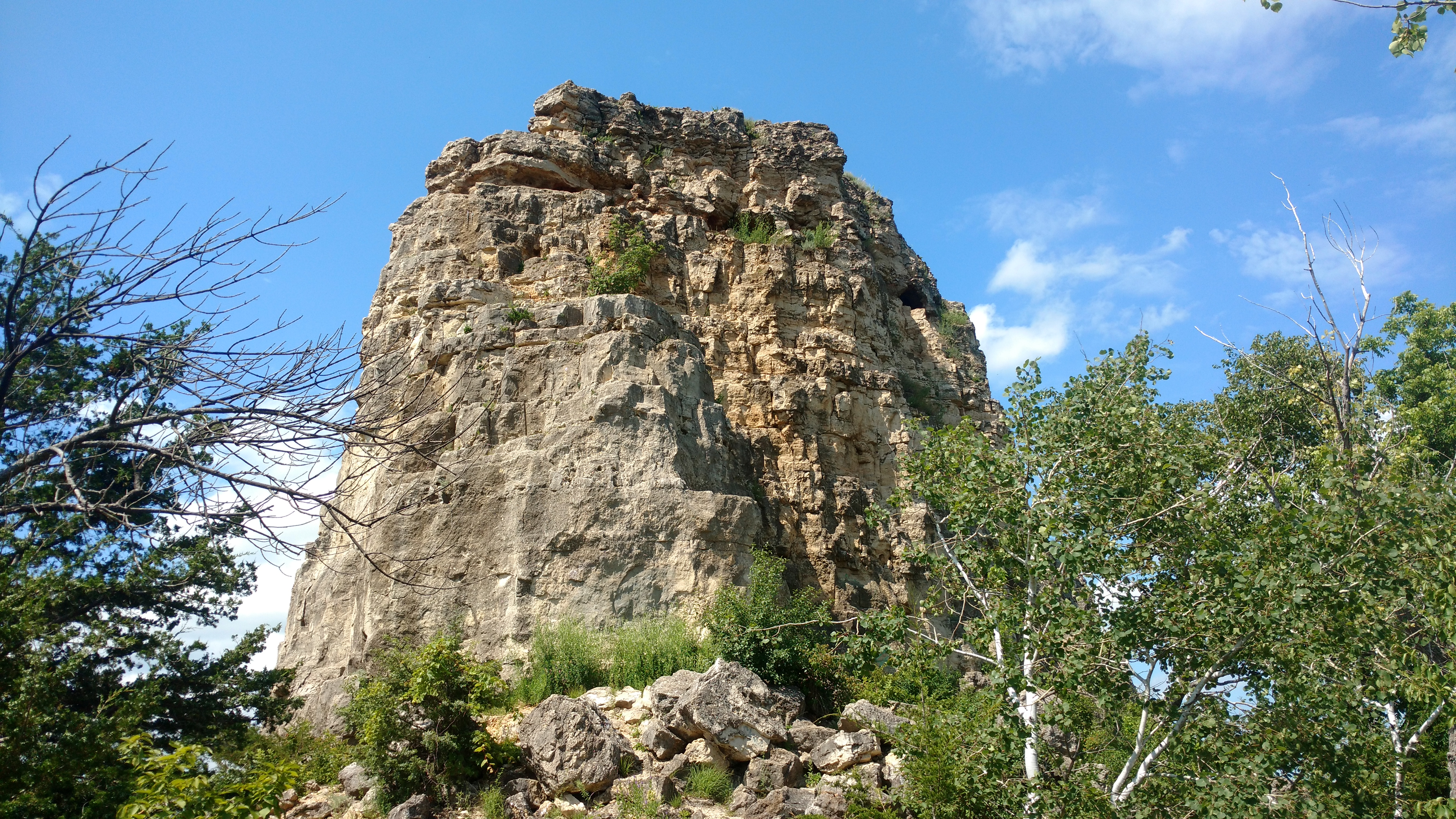
The rock pinnacle atop Sugar Loaf

Sugar Loaf's distinctive pinnacle resulted from quarrying the bluff's limestone cap layer through most of the 1880s, which was then used for Winona's sidewalks and stone buildings. The mining was done by two brothers, John and Stephen O'Dea. The use of limestone (Oneota dolomite—a sedimentary limestone composed mainly of calcium and magnesium carbonate) began with the need to improve city sidewalks, most of which were made of wood and burned in the 1862 fire that destroyed 90 percent of the downtown district. Many miles of this limestone were installed before the turn of the 20th century and met with such success that a city ordinance was passed in late 1890 specifying stone-only for sidewalks. Buildings in the area also began to utilize the stone because of its texture. Quarry operations were shut down in 1887.

A rare event occurred in March 2004. Tons of limestone sheared off the northwest face of the pinnacle, leaving a dark trail of rock rubble in the snow, down a lower cliff face, and onto the tree-covered slope below. The cascade stopped about 100 yards (91 m) short of the nearest house. The layers of stone came loose and fell because of the freezing and thawing action of water over time, especially from the unusually wet winter.

== History ==
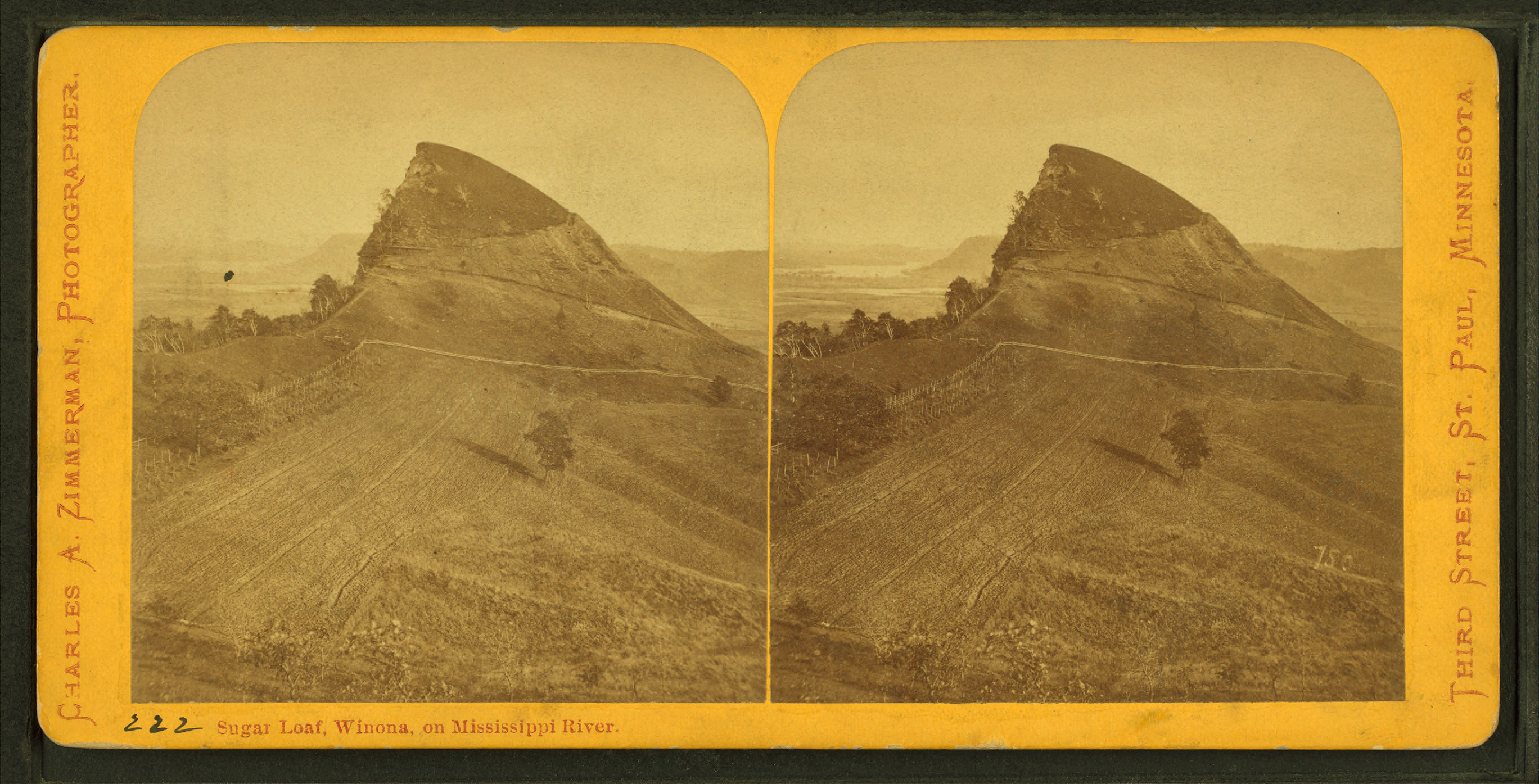
Sugar Loaf stereoscopic view card circa 1870, by Charles A. Zimmerman, 1844-1909

In its original configuration as a rounded half-dome with a fringe of evergreen on the crown, the bluff was well known to early explorers, traders, tourists, and river boat pilots. Native American legend has it that the mountain represented the cap of Chief Wapasha I transformed into stone. Another legend refers to a mythological dispute at the site of Red Wing, Minnesota, upriver from Winona in which a single bluff split into Barn Bluff (which remained at Red Wing) and Sugar Loaf, which was moved downriver to its present site. The name "Sugar Loaf" refers to the former formation's resemblance to the conical loaves that sugar used to be packaged and sold in. There are many hills and mountains named "Sugar Loaf" in the United States. At least three other hills or bluffs bearing the name "Sugar Loaf" are located in or near the Mississippi River Valley in proximity to Winona. In 1950, the Daughters of the American Revolution bought Sugar Loaf and the land around it to donate to the city of Winona. It has been a city park since then.

More than a few local businesses that incorporate Sugar Loaf into their names have been built at the base of the bluff. The Sugar Loaf name is also given to a neighborhood (which shows as a city on some maps) south and east of the hill. The former Sugar Loaf Brewery (Peter Bub's Brewery) building is nestled into the northeastern slope. The brewery complex, which extended caves into Sugar Loaf, is separately listed on the National Register of Historic Places.

== Gallery ==
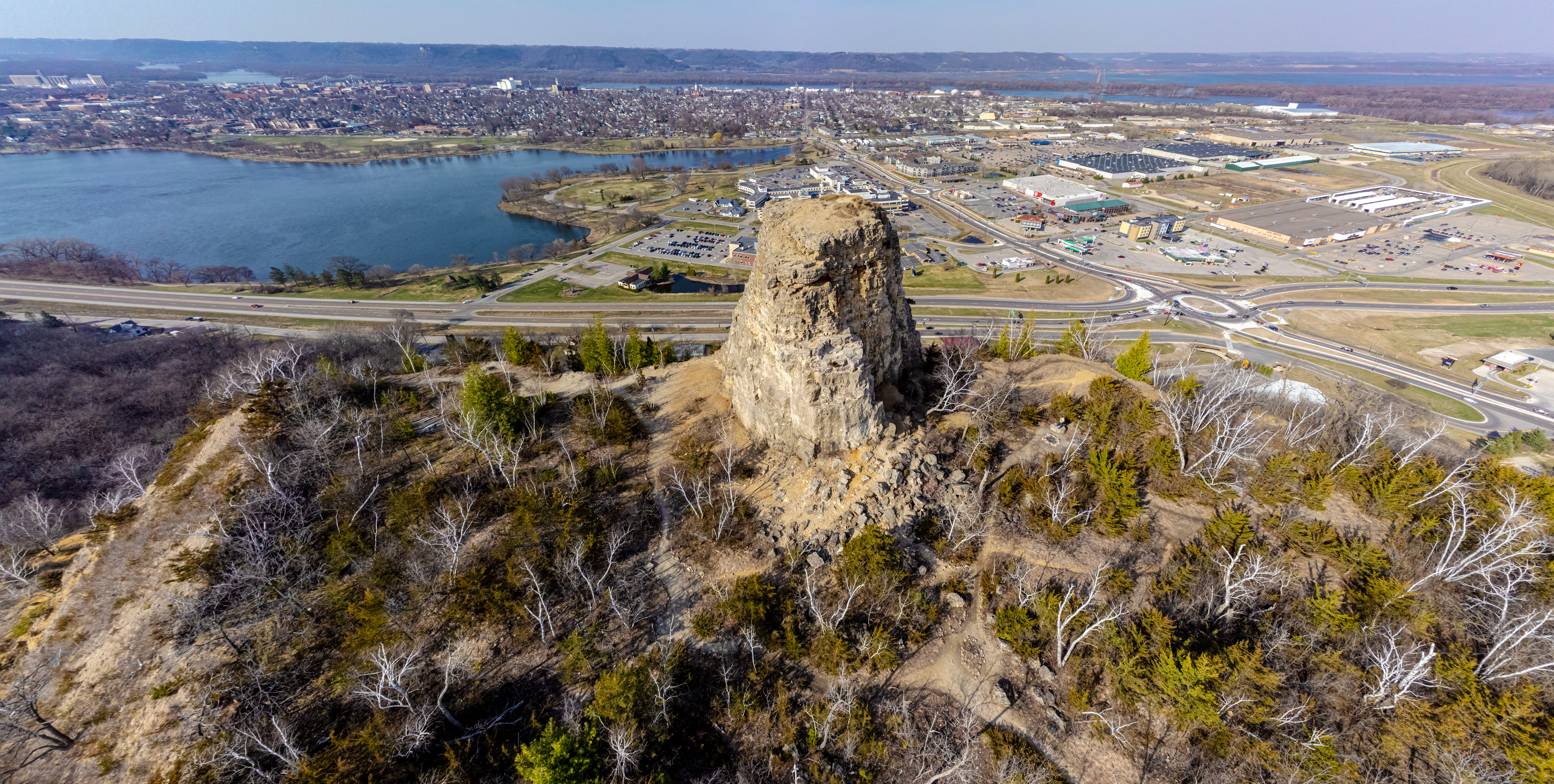

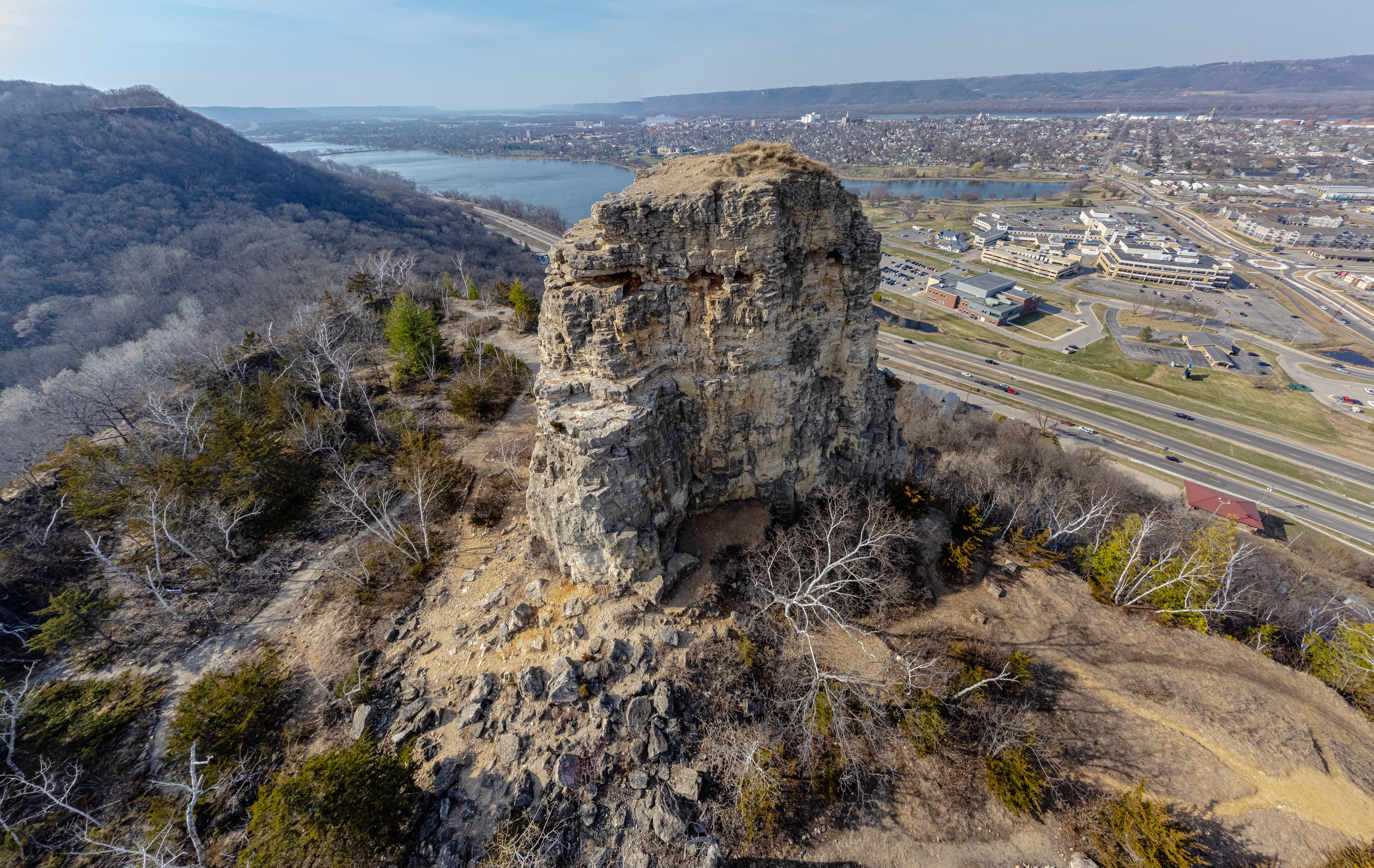

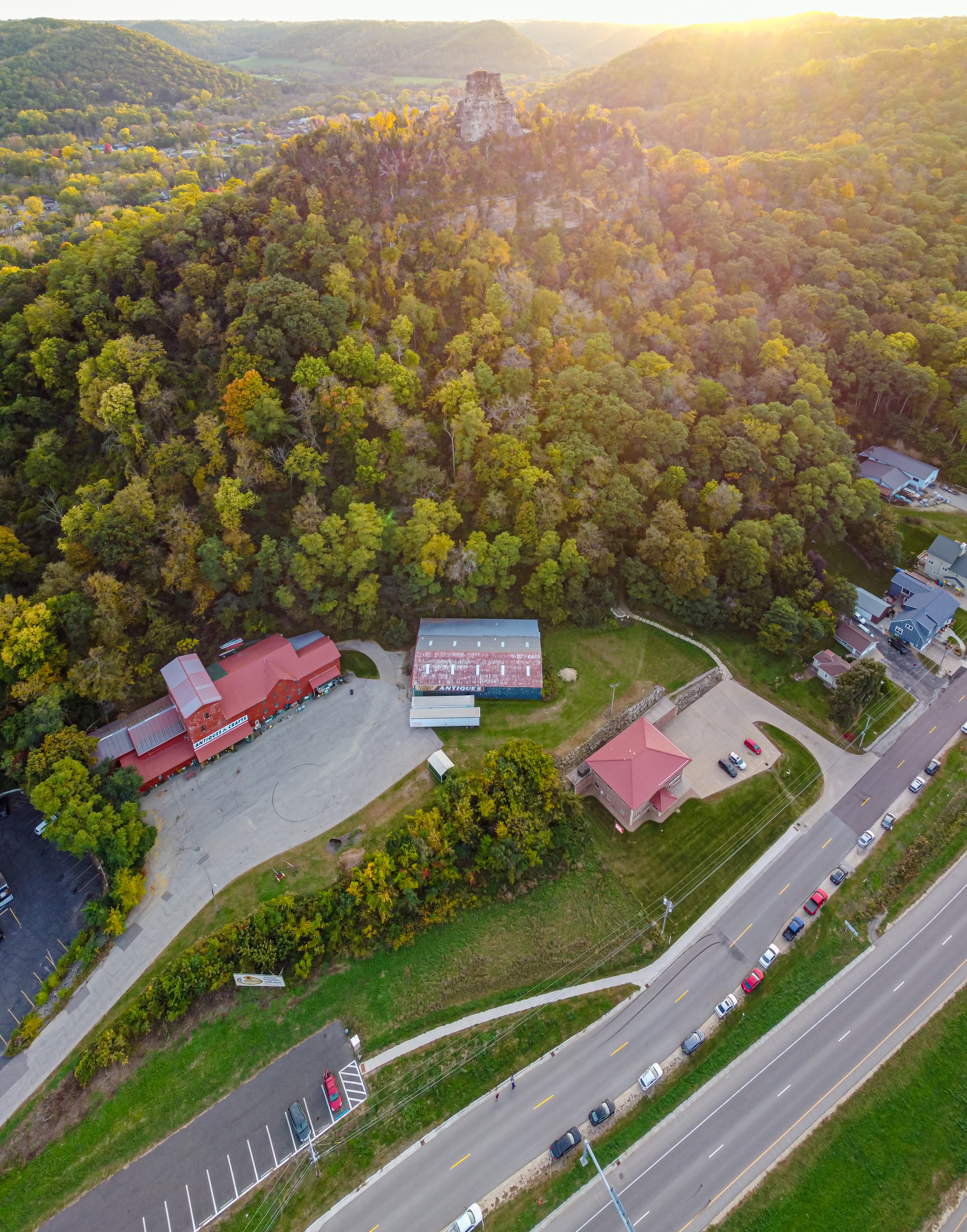
Showing trailhead and parking area

== See also ==
- National Register of Historic Places listings in Winona County, Minnesota
