= Barn Bluff (Red Wing, Minnesota) =

- He Mni Can - Barn Bluff
- U.S. National Register of Historic Places
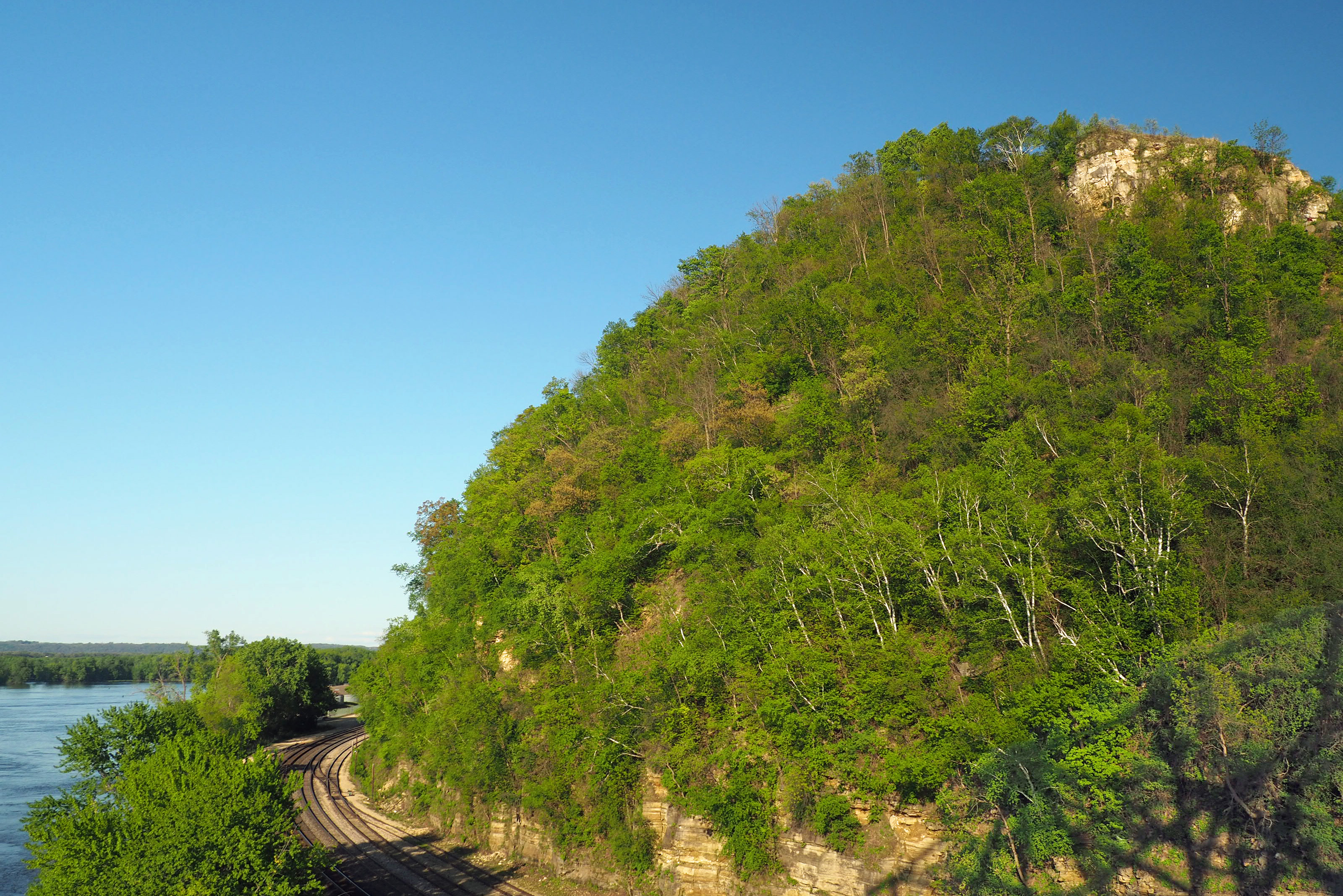
- Barn Bluff from the Red Wing Bridge

- Location within Minnesota
- Location: Red Wing, Minnesota
- Coordinates: 44°34′12″N 92°31′38″W
- NRHP reference No.: 90001165
- Added to NRHP: August 3, 1990

Barn Bluff (Dakota: Ȟemníčhaŋ, frequently anglicized to He Mni Can) is a bluff along the Mississippi River in Red Wing, Minnesota, United States. The bluff is considered sacred by the Dakota people because it is the site of many burial mounds. During the 19th century, the bluff functioned as a visual reference for explorers and travelers and later served as a limestone quarry.

The bluff overlooks the downtown area and towers about 400 feet (120 m) above the Mississippi River with an extensive view of Lake Pepin to the south. It is one of hundreds of bluffs in the Driftless Area, which covers parts of Wisconsin, Iowa, and Illinois, in addition to the southeastern toe of Minnesota.

== Geology ==
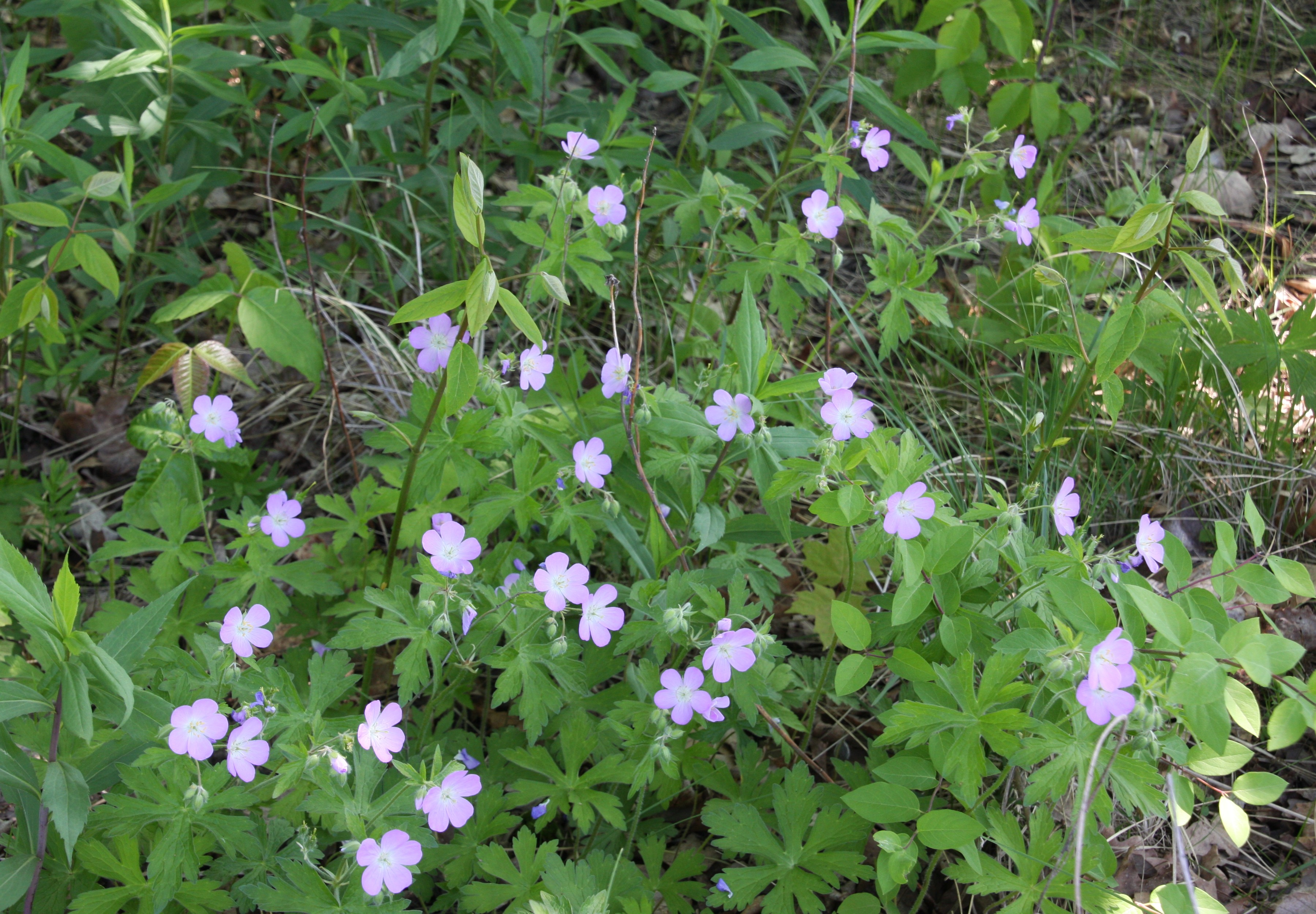
Geranium maculatum flowering under a tree on Barn Bluff

Most of the bluff is displaced approximately 40 metres (131 ft) upwards relative to the adjoining bedrock along the Red Wing Fault, which transects the bluff near its south face. It is composed of early Paleozoic rocks, including Ordovician dolomite and sandstone atop Cambrian shale, siltstone and greensand at its base, deposited by early Paleozoic seas. The aggregates left by glacial drift and wind-deposited loess form a 20 metres (66 ft) cap deposited some 450 million years after the bedrock beneath. Barn Bluff was cut off from nearby uplands by an earlier course of the ancestral Mississippi along which US Highway 61 now runs, and it was an island during the massive outflow of Glacial River Warren which carved much of the present Upper Mississippi Valley.

== History ==
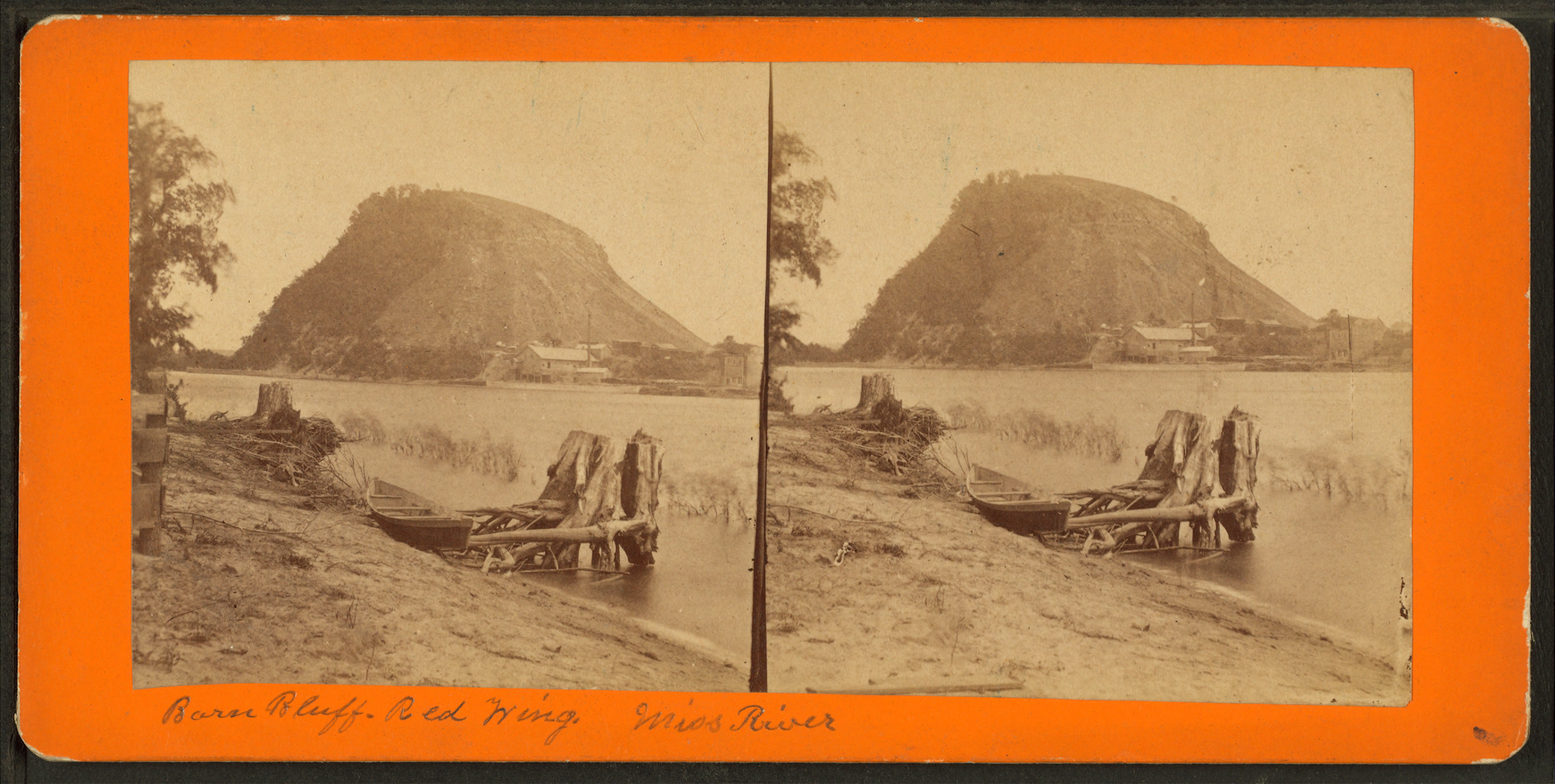
Stereoscopic photograph of the bluff by Benjamin Franklin Upton

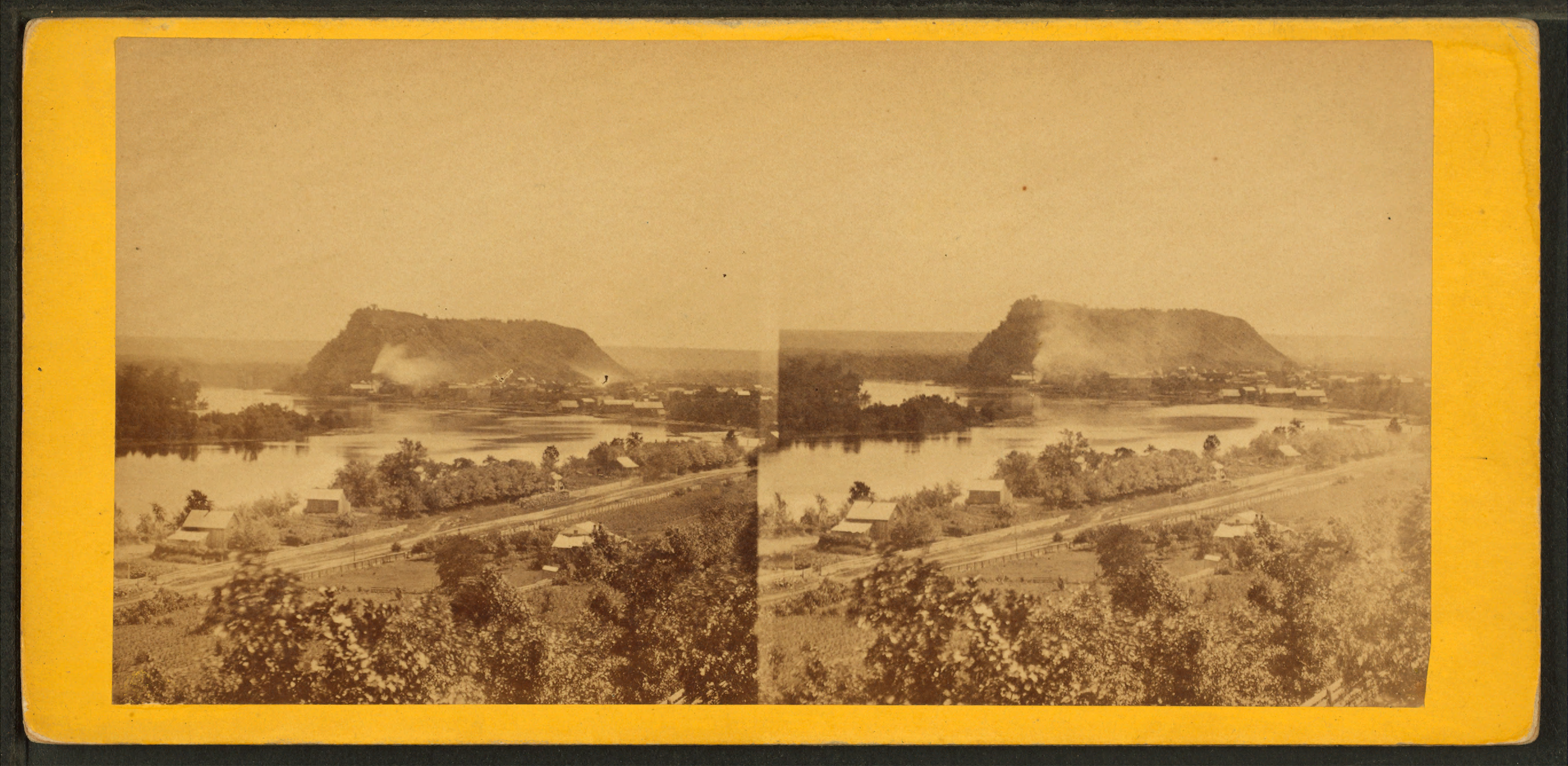
Barn Bluff and the Mississippi River

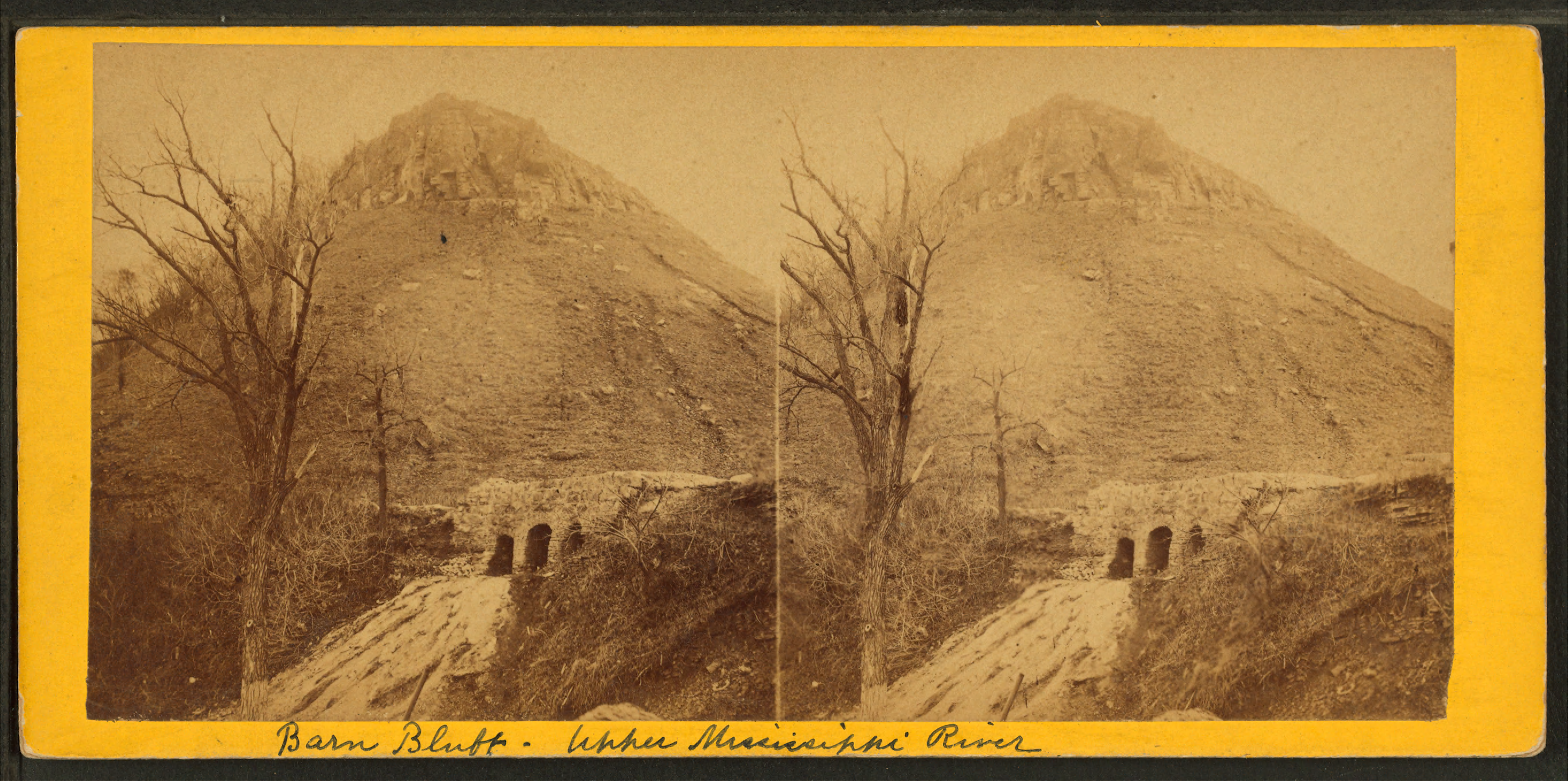
Another of Upton's.images of Barn Bluff

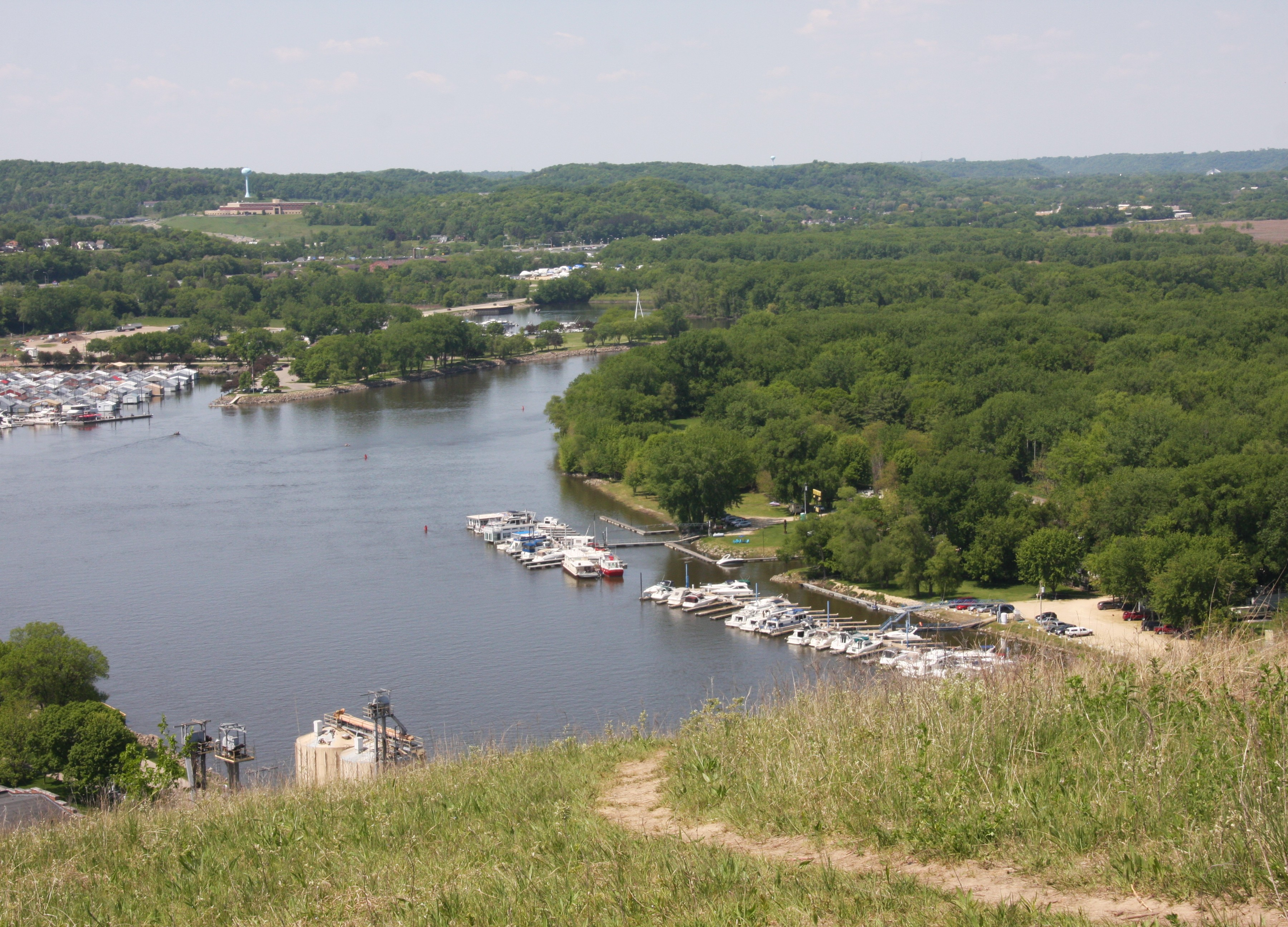
Looking down on Red Wing Harbor of the Mississippi River from a hiking trail on Barn Bluff

Prior to the arrival of European settlers, the bluff was used for sacred ceremonies for a number of Native American groups, most recently the Dakota who refer to it as He Mni Can ("Hill, water, wood"). There are ancient burial grounds dating back to A.D. 900-1300, located on top of the bluff and it is considered one of the most sacred places to the Dakota people. In the early 1800s, He Mni Can was the Dakota village site of Khupahu Sha (Red Wing), population of 300, who left the area in 1853 after signing the Treaty of Traverse des Sioux. Seth Eastman painted a watercolor of that Dakota village in the 1840s and it is titled "Red Wing's Village 70 Miles below the Falls of St. Anthony". Besides being a place of worship and burial, the Dakota people also used it as a defensive location during battle. According to missionary Joseph W. Hancock, who observed in 1850 a false alarm where the Dakota thought an Ojibwe attack was imminent: "all the men gathered their weapons of war and took their canoes and were soon out of sight, in some hiding place along the river. The women and children taking what valuables they could carry, ascended Barn bluff, where they gathered stones and other missiles for self-defense."

Dakota legend about the bluff tells that hundreds of years ago, a mountain twice as big stood in the place of Barn Bluff. The residents of two Dakota villages disputed the possession of the mountain. As a compromise, the Great Spirit divided the mountain into two parts. One part stayed in Red Wing, and the other part was moved downstream to Winona, Minnesota, where it is known as Sugar Loaf.

In the 17th century, the French explored the area and probably conferred the title of LaGrange, but no record exists of who named the bluff. The name of Barn Bluff, according to Warren Upham, "is translated from its early French name, La Grange, meaning the Barn, which refers to its prominence as a lone, high, and nearly level-crested bluff, quite separated from the side bluffs of the valley, and therefore conspicuously seen at a distance of many miles up the valley and yet more observable from boats passing along Lake Pepin." The earliest published mention of the site appears to be in Jonathan Carver's Travels where he refers to having visited this feature in 1766. He described the view from Barn Bluff, writing, "The most beautiful prospect that imagination can form [...] Verdant plains, fruitful meadows, and numerous islands abound with the most varied trees. [...] But above all, reaching as far as the eye can extend, is the majestic, softly flowing river." Stephen H. Long climbed the bluff during his 1819 mapping expedition, describing it as, "From the summit of the Grange the view of the surrounding scenery is surpassed, perhaps, by very few, if any, of a similar character that the country and probably the world can afford. The sublime and beautiful are here blended in the most enchanting manner."

The bluff was used as a limestone quarry for about 40 years and was significant source of building materials for the city and surrounding areas as far as St. Paul and Minneapolis. The quarrying operation was shut down in 1908 when citizens protested the defacing of the bluff. In 1910, the land was donated to the city as a park and the former G.A. Carlson Lime Kiln was placed on The National Register of Historic Places on September 27, 1976.

In recent years, the city of Red Wing amended the name of the bluff to include the Dakota name and refers to it as He Mni Can-Barn Bluff. Today the bluff is thickly forested with deciduous trees at the top, with grass growing all throughout the base, and ringed all around by sandstone cliffs, except at the northern end where steps have been built and carved into the bluff. Using these steps, hikers can ascend the bluff with a strenuous but relatively brief hike.

The naturalist, essayist and philosopher Henry David Thoreau visited Red Wing in June 1861, less than a year before his death. He hiked to the top of the bluff and read his mail and wrote to a friend. "The top, as you know," he wrote, "rises to the general level of the surrounding country, the river having eaten out so much. Yet the valley just above and below this (we are at the head of Lake Pepin) must be three or four miles wide."
