= Mdewakanton =

Sub-tribe of the Isanti (Santee) Dakota (Sioux)

The Mdewakanton or Mdewakantonwan (also spelled Mdewákhaŋthuŋwaŋ and currently pronounced Bdewákhaŋthuŋwaŋ) are one of the sub-tribes of the Isanti (Santee) Dakota (Sioux). Their historic home is Mille Lacs Lake (Dakota: Mde Wákhaŋ/Bde Wákhaŋ, Spirit/Mystic Lake) in central Minnesota. Together with the Wahpekute (Waȟpékhute – "Shooters Among the Trees"), they form the so-called Upper Council of the Dakota or Santee Sioux (Isáŋyáthi – "Knife Makers"). Today their descendants are members of federally recognized tribes in Minnesota, South Dakota and Nebraska of the United States, and First Nations in Manitoba, Canada.

== History ==
1843 Nicollet Map locating the Mdewakanton

Tradition has it that the Mdewakanton were the leading tribe of Očhéthi Šakówiŋ. Their ancestors may have migrated to the upper Midwest from further south and east. Over the years they migrated up through present-day Ohio and into Wisconsin. Seven Sioux tribes formed an alliance, which they called Oceti Sakowin or Očhéthi Šakówiŋ ("The Seven Council Fires"), consisting of the four tribes of the Eastern Dakota, two tribes of the Western Dakota, as well as the largest group, the Lakota (often referred to as Teton, derived from Thítȟuŋwaŋ – "Dwellers of the Plains"). Facing competition from the Ojibwe and other Great Lakes Native American Algonquian-speaking tribes in the 1600s, the Santee moved further west into present-day Minnesota.

In 1687 Greysolon du Lhut recorded his visit to the "great village of the Nadouecioux, called Izatys". It was described as being on the southwestern shore of the eponymous Mde Wakan [Lake Mystery/Holy], now called Mille Lacs Lake, in north central Minnesota. Originally the term Santee was applied only to the Mdewakanton and later also to the closely related and allied Wahpekute. (As it was a nomadic group, it was not identified by the suffixes of thuŋwaŋ – "settlers," or towan – "village"). Soon European settlers applied the name to all the tribes of the Eastern Dakota.

In the fall of 1837, the Mdewakantonwan negotiated a deal with the U.S. government under an "Indian Removal" treaty, whereby they were promised nearly one million dollars for all their lands east of the Mississippi River, including all islands in the river. Dwindling populations of game due to the American fur trade and the threat of starvation were motivators to the Mdewakanton to sign the treaty. Payment for the land was not received in one lump sum. Instead, the treaty stated that US$300,000 would be invested by the government and that the Mdewakanton would receive "annually, forever, an income of not less than five percent...a portion of said interest, not exceeding one third, to be applied in such manner as the President may direct." This discretionary fund worth $5,000 a year proved to be one of the most controversial parts of the treaty, as the government insisted that it had been allocated for educational programs for the Mdewakanton, but spent very little of the money over a period of fifteen years.

== US reservations with Mdewakanton descendants ==
The Mdewakantonwan traditionally consisted of decentralized villages led by different leaders and today, they maintain separate reservations with their own tribal government. In the United States, the Mdewakanton are counted among other Dakota and Yankton-Yanktonai bands as the Dakota:

=== South Dakota ===
- Crow Creek Sioux Tribe on Crow Creek Indian Reservation (Mdewakanton, Yankton, some Lower Yanktonai or Hunkpatina)
- Flandreau Santee Sioux Tribe on Flandreau Indian Reservation (Mdewakanton, Wahpekute, Wahpeton)

=== Minnesota ===
- Upper Sioux Community – Pejuhutazizi Oyate on Upper Sioux Indian Reservation (Pezihutazizi in Dakota) (Sisseton, Wahpeton, Mdewakanton)
- Lower Sioux Indian Community on Lower Sioux Indian Reservation (Mdewankanton Tribal Reservation) (Mdewakanton, Wahpekute)
- Shakopee Mdewakanton Sioux Community (also known as: Shakopee Mdewakanton Dakota Community or Shakopee Tribe) on Shakopee-Mdewakanton Indian Reservation (Mdewakanton, Wahpekute)
- Prairie Island Indian Community on Prairie Island Indian Community (Tinta Winta in Dakota) (Mdewakanton, Wahpekute)

Some Mdewakanton in Minnesota live among Ojibwe people on the Mille Lacs Reservation as Mille Lacs Band of Mdewakanton Dakota, forming one of the historical bands that were amalgamated to become the Mille Lacs Band of Ojibwe.

=== Nebraska ===
- Santee Sioux Nation (also known as Santee Sioux Tribe of Nebraska) on Santee Sioux Reservation (Mdewakanton, Wahpekute)

== First Nations with Mdewakanton descendants ==
In Canada, the Mdewakanton live with members of other Dakota and Yanktonai band governments as Dakota peoples:

=== Manitoba ===
- Sioux Valley Dakota Nation on Sioux Valley Dakota Nation Reserve and Fishing Station 62A Reserve (Sisseton, Wahpeton, some Mdewakanton and Wahpekute)
- Birdtail Sioux First Nation on Birdtail Creek 57 Reserve, Birdtail Hay Lands 57A Reserve, and on Fishing Station 62A Reserve (Mdewakanton, Wahpekute and some Yanktonai)

Some may live also within the White Bear First Nations, which consists mostly of members of the Plains Cree, Western Saulteaux and Assiniboine.

== Historic tribes of the Mdewakanton ==
- Wakpaatonwedan division ("Those who dwell on the creek", "Dwellers on the creek"; one of the two early divisions of the Mdewakanton Sioux). They had their village on Rice creek, Minnesota. In 1858 it comprised the following bands: Kiyuksa, Ohanhanska, Tacanhpisapa, Anoginajin, Tintaotonwe, and Oyateshicha.
  - real Wakpaatonwedan (lived along Rice creek, Minnesota)
  - Kiyuska ("violators of custom", "rule breakers", lived below Lake Pepin, their main village Keoxa was at the side of today's Winona, Minnesota), led by a succession of chiefs with the name Wapasha
  - Oyateshicha
  - Tintaotonwe (Tinta-otonwe, 'village on the prairie'). A former Mdewakanton Sioux band. The village was situated on lower Minnesota River and was once the residence of Wabasha, the Kiyuksa chief, until he removed with most of his warriors, leaving a few families under his son, Takopepeshene, Dauntless, who became a dependent of Shakopee (Shakpe), the neighboring chief of Taoapa.
  - Ohanhanska
    - Tacanhpisapa
    - Anoginajin
- Matantonwan division (said to mean 'village of the great lake which empties into a small one,' and therefore probably from mdo-te, 'the outlet of a lake'). One of the two early primary divisions of the Mdewakanton Sioux. They are mentioned as residing at the mouth of the Minnesota River in 1685. To this division belonged in 1858 the Khemnichan, Kapozha, Maghayuteshni, Makhpiyamaza, Kheyataotonwe, and Tintaotonwe bands. All these are now on Santee res., Nebr.
  - real Matantonwan (lived at the mouth of the Minnesota River)
  - Pinisha or Pinichon (lived at Nine Mile creek on the north shore of the Minnesota River about nine miles above Fort Snelling, named after chief Pinisha, "Good Road")
  - Kaposia or Kapozha kodozapuwa ("Those who travel with light burdens", "Light baggage", their village was closest to Fort Snelling on the Mississippi River a few miles south of the site of Saint Paul, Minnesota), led by famous chief Taoyateduta (Little Crow / Le Petite Corbeau)
  - Khemnichan or Weakaote
  - Magayuteshni
  - Mahpiyamaza or Makhpiyamaza (their village was in the 1850s on the west side of the Mississippi River above the mouth of St. Croix near the present site of Hastings, Minnesota, named after the chief Makhpiyamaza, "Iron Cloud")
  - Mahpiyawichasta (lived in the vicinity of today's Chain of Lakes, later established a permanent village few miles west of Fort Snelling on the eastern shore of Mde/Bde Maka Ska - "White Earth Lake", later called Mde Medoza − "Lake of the Loons" (renamed Lake Calhoun), band was named after its war chief Marpiyawicasta, "Man of the Clouds", or Makh-pea Wechashta, "Cloud Man")
  - Kheyataotonwe or Kay-yah-ta Otonwa ("Village whose houses have roofs", presumably identical with a village of the same name of chief Marpiyawicasta, "Man of the Clouds")
  - Reyata otonwe or Reyata Otonwa ("People who live back from the river", i.e. "Minnesota River", village at Lake Bde Maka Ska)
  - Taoapa (A band of Mdewakanton Sioux, formerly living on the Minnesota River in the present Scott co., Minn., and hunting between it and the Mississippi. Their village, generally known as Shakopee's Village, or Little Six's Village, from the chief of the band, was on the left bank of the river and the cemetery on the opposite side in 1835.)

Only the Kiyuska, Pinisha, Reyata otonwe/Reyata Otonwa and real Matantonwan bands survive as organized groups today.

== See also ==
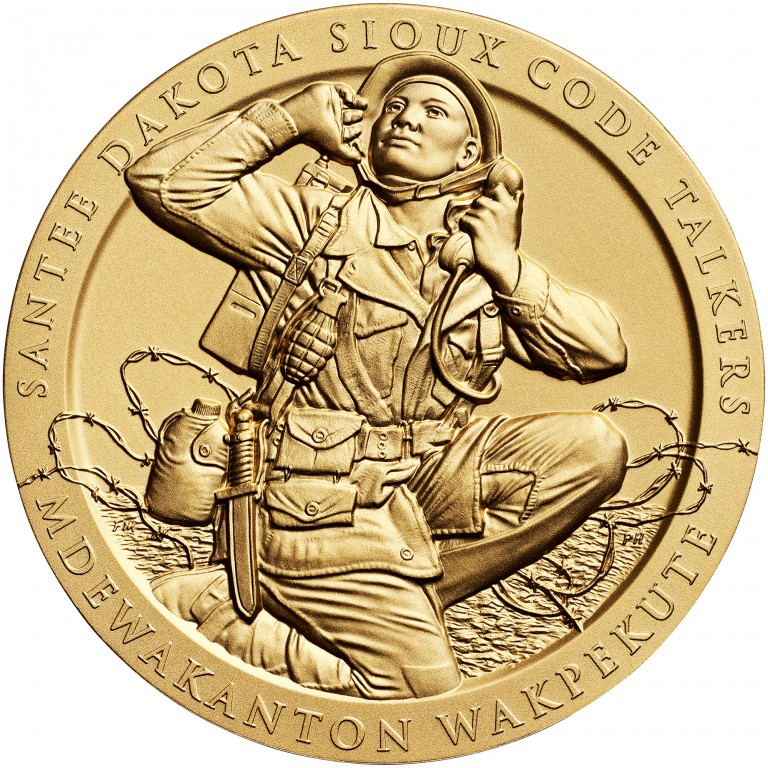
Mdewakanton Wakpekute Code talkers Congressional Medal

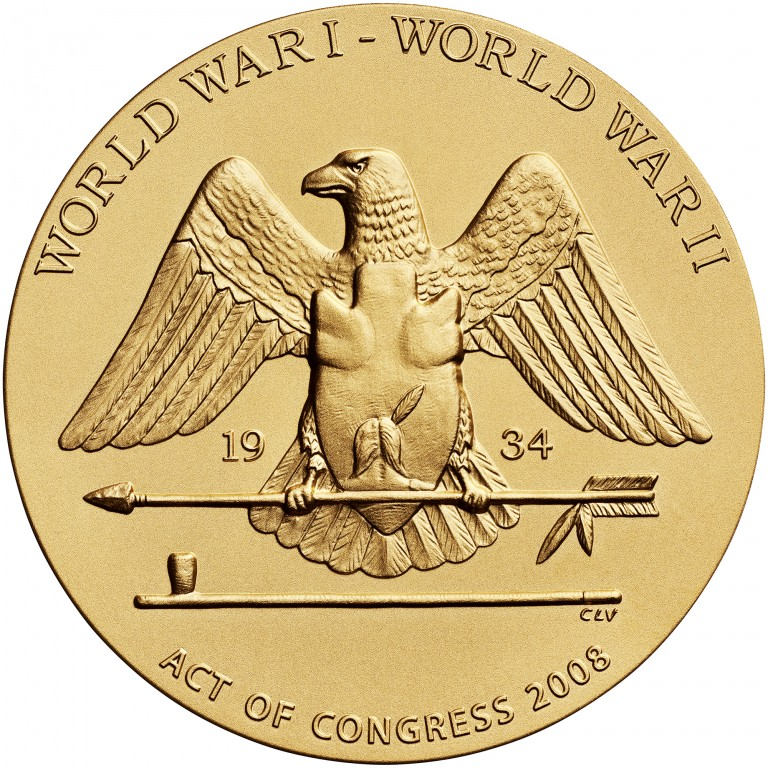
Mdewakanton Wakpekute Code talkers Congressional Medal

- Chief Wabasha II
- Chief Wabasha III
- Mille Lacs Indians
- Mille Lacs Lake
- Rum River
- Snana
- Tamaha (Dakota scout)
- Taoyateduta

== General references ==
- Hodge, Frederick Webb (1906). "Mdewakanton Indian Chiefs and Leaders." The Handbook of American Indians North of Mexico. Bureau of American Ethnology, Government Printing Office.
- Williamson, John P. (1902). An English-Dakota Dictionary. New York: American Tract Society.
