= Treaty of St. Peters =

1805 and 1837 treaty between the United States and Native Americans in Minneasota

Treaty of St. Peters may be one of three treaties conducted between the United States and Native American peoples, conducted at the confluence of the Minnesota River (then called "St. Peters River") with the Mississippi River, in what today is Mendota, Minnesota.

== 1805 Treaty of St. Peters ==
The 1805 Treaty of St. Peters or the Treaty with the Sioux, better known as Pike's Purchase, was a treaty conducted between Lieutenant Zebulon Pike for the United States and Chiefs Le Petit Corbeau (grandfather of the famous Dakota chief Little Crow III) and Way Aga Enogee on behalf of the Sioux Nation. The treaty conducted on September 23, 1805, purchases two tracts of land: nine-square miles each at the confluence of the St. Croix River about what now is Hastings, Minnesota and the confluence of the Minnesota River with Mississippi about what now is Mendota, Minnesota, to establish military posts at each of the two sites. A military post was not established at the confluence of the St. Croix with the Mississippi, but Fort Snelling was established on the bluffs overlooking the confluence of the Minnesota with the Mississippi. Though the treaty was never proclaimed by the President of the United States, it was ratified by the United States Congress on April 16, 1808.

== 1837 Treaty of St. Peters ==
- See White Pine Treaty

== 1851 Treaty of St. Peters ==
- See Treaty of Mendota

== See also ==
- Lac Courte Oreilles Band of Lake Superior Chippewa Indians v. Wisconsin
- Minnesota v. Mille Lacs Band of Chippewa Indians, 526 U.S. 127 (1999)
