= List of ship launches in 1832 =

The list of ship launches in 1832 includes a chronological list of some ships launched in 1832.

| Date | Ship | Class | Builder | Location | Country | Notes |
|---|---|---|---|---|---|---|
| 18 January | Pelion | Merchantman | John Burdon | Sunderland | United Kingdom | For Caleb Wilson & Sons. |
| 19 January | Imogen | East Indiaman | Messrs. Steels | Liverpool | United Kingdom | For Taylor, Potter & Co. |
| 25 January | Eclipse | Schooner | Messrs. Bowes | Whitehaven | United Kingdom | For Belfast, London and Whitehaven Shipping Company. |
| 2 February | Conway | Conway-class corvette | | Chatham Dockyard | United Kingdom | For Royal Navy. |
| 4 February | Regina | Brig | R. & N. Campion | Whitby | United Kingdom | For private owner. |
| 11 February | Zillah | West Indiaman | Adamson | Dundee | United Kingdom | For George Clark. |
| 16 February | Ariadne | Full-rigged ship | Parmeter | Fareham | United Kingdom | For Messrs. Burrell. |
| 2 March | Bon Accord | Whaler | Morton | Aberdeen | United Kingdom | For private owner. |
| 2 March | Thomas Dougall | Brig | Nicol & Reid | Aberdeen | United Kingdom | For private owner. |
| 3 March | Corsair | Barque | Henry Barrick | Whitby | United Kingdom | For private owner. |
| 17 March | Columbus | Full-rigged ship | G. & H. Barrick | Whitby | United Kingdom | For private owner. |
| 17 March | Royal Adelaide | Steamship | Menzies & Son | Leith | United Kingdom | For London, Leith, Edinburgh and Glasgow Shipping Company. |
| 2 April | The Thomas | Barque | | Dublin | United Kingdom | For Daniel Hodgens. |
| 5 April | Dee | Paddle steamer | Seppings & Laing | Woolwich Dockyard | United Kingdom | For Royal Navy. |
| 11 April | Reform | Brig | Buckle & Davis | Chepstow | United Kingdom | For private owner. |
| 16 April | Rhadamanthus | Paddle sloop | Roberts | Plymouth Dockyard | United Kingdom | For Royal Navy. |
| 16 April | Victory | Steamship | Wilson & Sons | Liverpool | United Kingdom | For Cork & Bristol Line. |
| 19 April | Elizabeth | Merchantman | S. &. P. Mills | Sunderland | United Kingdom | For private owner. |
| 23 April | Earl Grey | Smack | | Carmarthen | United Kingdom | For W. Phillips. |
| April | Emblem | Merchantman | William Potts | Sunderland | United Kingdom | For Purdy & Co. |
| April | Experiment | Schooner | | Washington Navy Yard | United States | For United States Navy. |
| April | Superb | Schooner | William Bailey | Ipswich | United Kingdom | For John Christie & others. |
| 1 May | Vernon | Fourth rate | | Woolwich Dockyard | United Kingdom | For Royal Navy. |
| 2 May | Castor | Castor-class frigate | | Chatham Dockyard | United Kingdom | For Royal Navy. |
| 2 May | Royal Louisa | Model frigate | Oliver Lang | Woolwich Dockyard | United Kingdom | For William IV, who gave it to the King of Prussia. |
| 3 May | Snake | Snake-class ship-sloop | | Limehouse | United Kingdom | For Royal Navy. |
| 14 May | Cockatrice | Cockatrice-class schooner | | Pembroke Dockyard | United Kingdom | For Royal Navy. |
| 14 May | John | Brig | Gutteridge | Selby | United Kingdom | For private owner. |
| 14 May | London | Merchantman | Wigram's | Blackwall | United Kingdom | For Wigram's. |
| 16 May | Fanny | Brig | Charles Connell & Sons | Belfast | United Kingdom | For private owner. |
| 16 May | Bougainville | Gazelle-class brig | | Toulon | France | For French Navy. |
| 16 May | Salamander | Paddle sloop | Seaton | Sheerness Dockyard | United Kingdom | For Royal Navy. |
| 31 May | Northumbrian | Merchantman | Witherby & Ihler | Newcastle upon Tyne | United Kingdom | For Flinn & Co. |
| May | Lord Aylmer | Full-rigged ship | | Quebec | (United Kingdom of Great Britain and Ireland) Upper Canada | For private owner. |
| May | The Majestic | Merchantman | | Dundee | United Kingdom | For private owner. |
| May | Thornley | Snow | Peter Austin | Sunderland | United Kingdom | For William Speeding. |
| 2 June | The Quorra | Steamship | | Liverpool | United Kingdom | For Messrs. Lander. |
| 8 June | Hibernia | Packet ship | Clarke & Sons | Dublin | United Kingdom | For Grand Canal Company. |
| 13 June | Courier | Steamship | Wilson & Sons | Liverpool | United Kingdom | For St George Steam Packet Company. |
| 13 June | Etienne Marchand | Gazelle-class brig | | Toulon | France | For French Navy. |
| 15 June | Scout | Scout-class ship-sloop | | Chatham Dockyard | United Kingdom | For Roya Navy. |
| 28 June | Laurier | Gazelle-class brig | | Cherbourg | France | For French Navy. |
| 28 June | The Johnstone | West Indiaman | Mottershead, Heyes & Son | Liverpool | United Kingdom | For Sandbach, Tinne & Co. |
| 30 June | John Watson | Steamship | Mulvey | Chester | United Kingdom | For private owner. |
| June | Angelicania | Barque | T. Reay | Sunderland | United Kingdom | For William & Thomas Malling. |
| June | Hippogriff | Merchantman | Kirkbride & Co. | Sunderland | United Kingdom | For R. French. |
| June | Neiri Shevket | Ship of the line | | Izmit | Ottoman Empire | For Ottoman Navy. |
| 13 July | Caroline | Merchantman | Metcalf & Son | South Shields | United Kingdom | For private owner. |
| 17 July | Rover | Sloop | | Chatham Dockyard | United Kingdom | For Royal Navy. |
| 18 July | Uranie | Fourth rate | Louis Charles Antoine Barraillier | Toulon | France | For French Navy. |
| 21 July | Serpent | Snake-class brig-sloop | | Limehouse | United Kingdom | For Royal Navy. |
| 28 July | Lord William Bentinck | Steamship | Maudsley & Co | Westminster | United Kingdom | For British East India Company. |
| 28 July | Scorpion | Cherokee-class brig-sloop | | Plymouth Dockyard | United Kingdom | For Royal Navy. |
| 30 July | Laperouse | Cygne-class brig | | Lorient | France | For French Navy. |
| July | Elizabeth | Brig | | Saint John | (United Kingdom of Great Britain and Ireland) Colony of New Brunswick | For private owner. |
| July | Stamford | Merchantman | | Hull | United Kingdom | For Messrs. Holden, Simpson & Moats. |
| 27 August | Andromache | Andromache-class frigate | | Pembroke Dockyard | United Kingdom | For Royal Navy. |
| 27 August | Mary Hudson | Merchantman | John M. Gales | South Hylton | United Kingdom | For Matthew Hudson. |
| 28 August | Forester | Cherokee-class brig-sloop | | Chatham Dockyard | United Kingdom | For Royal Navy. |
| 28 August | Thomas Leech | Brig | J. Steel & Co | Liverpool | United Kingdom | For Messrs. Taylor, Potter & Co. |
| August | Manico | Snow | George Frater & Co | Sunderland | United Kingdom | For H. Punton. |
| August | Van Speyk | Merchantman | | Amsterdam | Netherlands | For private owner. |
| 10 September | Cassard | Cygne-class brig | | Lorient | France | For French Navy. |
| 11 September | Griffon | Cherokee-class brig-sloop | | Chatham Dockyard | United Kingdom | For Royal Navy. |
| 11 September | Traveller | Merchantman | Ogden and Simey | Pallion | United Kingdom | For private owner. |
| 12 September | Brilliant | Lightship | Brady | Dublin | United Kingdom | For Trinity House. |
| 12 September | Cobrera | Merchantman | Philip Laing | Sunderland | United Kingdom | For Philip Laing. |
| 13 September | Pallada | Frigate | Admiralty Shipyard | Saint Petersburg | Russia | For Imperial Russian Navy. |
| 25 September | Phoenix | Paddle sloop | Seppings | Plymouth Dockyard | United Kingdom | For Royal Navy. |
| 25 September | St. Patrick | Steamship | Humble, Hurry & Milcrest | Liverpool | United Kingdom | For Sir John Tobin. |
| 26 September | Borda | Gazelle-class brig | | Bayonne | France | For French Navy. |
| 27 September | Neptune | Caledonia-class ship of the line | | Portsmouth Dockyard | United Kingdom | For Royal Navy. |
| 29 September | Firefly | Firefly-class gunboat | | Woolwich Dockyard | United Kingdom | For Royal Navy. |
| 29 September | Mariner | Mersey flat | James Gibson | Northwich | United Kingdom | For private owner. |
| September | Catherine | Snow | J. Brunton | Sunderland | United Kingdom | For private owner. |
| 8 October | Monarch | Canopus-class ship of the line | | Chatham Dockyard | United Kingdom | For Royal Navy. |
| 11 October | Rhijn | Frigate | | Vlissingen | Netherlands | For Royal Netherlands Navy. |
| 22 October | Aaron Manby | Steamship | | "Port-au-Bie" | France | For private owner. |
| 22 October | Wansbeck | Brig | | Seaham | United Kingdom | For private owner |
| 10 November | Water-witch | Steamship | Seddon and Laidley | North Birkenhead | United Kingdom | For private owner. |
| November | Elizabeth | Merchantman | T. Reed | Sunderland | United Kingdom | For private owner. |
| 22 December | Frederick Hooth | Brig | Thomas Roydon & Co. | Liverpool | United Kingdom | For private owner. |
| Summer | Warrior | Steamboat | Joseph Throckmorton | Pittsburgh, Pennsylvania | United States | For Joseph Throckmorton and William Hempstead. |
| Autumn | Everina | Brig | | St. Martin's | (United Kingdom of Great Britain and Ireland) Colony of New Brunswick | For private owner. |
| Unknown date | Active | Merchantman | | Sunderland | United Kingdom | For private owner. |
| Unknown date | Adelaide | Cutter | | Illawarra | (United Kingdom of Great Britain and Ireland) New South Wales | For private owner. |
| Unknown date | Ajax | Sixth rate | | Rotterdam | Netherlands | For Royal Netherlands Navy. |
| Unknown date | Alburka | Steamship | Andrew Morrison | Liverpool | United Kingdom | For private owner. |
| Unknown date | Anne | Snow | | Sunderland | United Kingdom | For W. Englisn. |
| Unknown date | Anne | Snow | | Sunderland | United Kingdom | For J. Straker. |
| Unknown date | Argo | Sixth rate | | | Netherlands | For Royal Netherlands Navy. |
| Unknown date | Bowes | Merchantman | J. Burdon | Sunderland | United Kingdom | For private owner. |
| Unknown date | Broad Oak | Barque | | Deptford | United Kingdom | For private owner. |
| Unknown date | Buchanan | Merchantman | William Gales | Sunderland | United Kingdom | For Hunter & Elliott. |
| Unknown date | Cæsar | Merchantman | | Sunderland | United Kingdom | For J. Colling. |
| Unknown date | Dorothy Forster | Merchantman | Philip Laing | Sunderland | United Kingdom | For Forster & Co. |
| Unknown date | Earl of Clare | Full-rigged ship | | Bombay | India | For private owner. |
| Unknown date | Egeria | Brig | William Gales | Sunderland | United Kingdom | For private owner. |
| Unknown date | Elvira | Snow | W. Adamson | Sunderland | United Kingdom | For Chicken & Co. |
| Unknown date | Experiment | Horse-powered paddle boat | | | (United Kingdom of Great Britain and Ireland) New South Wales | For Mr. Singleton. |
| Unknown date | Falk | Schooner | | | Sweden | For Royal Swedish Navy. |
| Unknown date | Fortitude | Brig | | Monkwearmouth | United Kingdom | For J. Wilson. |
| Unknown date | Gowlands | Merchantman | J. Bell | Sunderland | United Kingdom | For Mr. Gowlands. |
| Unknown date | Gustaf den Store | Man of war | | | Sweden | For Royal Swedish Navy. |
| Unknown date | Haidee | Schooner | John Ball Jr. | Salcombe | United Kingdom | For William Beer, John Jordan and others. |
| Unknown date | Ingham | Morris-Taney-class cutter | Webb and Allen | New York | United States | For United States Revenue Cutter Service. |
| Unknown date | Isabella | Brig | | Belfast | United Kingdom | For private owner. |
| Unknown date | Jackson | Morris-Taney-class cutter | | Washington Navy Yard | United States | For United States Revenue Cutter Service. |
| Unknown date | Jane Ayre | Snow | Halls | Sunderland | United Kingdom | For Ayre & Co. |
| Unknown date | Jane and Margaret | Merchantman | W. Cornforth | Sunderland | United Kingdom | For private owner. |
| Unknown date | Jane & Mary | Merchantman | Peter Austin | Sunderland | United Kingdom | For private owner. |
| Unknown date | John & Amelia | Merchantman | J. Storey | Sunderland | United Kingdom | For Mr. Patterson. |
| Unknown date | John Thompson | Merchantman | Halls | Sunderland | United Kingdom | For John Thompson. |
| Unknown date | Laurel | Brig | John M. Gales | Sunderland | United Kingdom | For private owner. |
| Unknown date | Lilburn | Snow | J. Bell | Sunderland | United Kingdom | For Gray & Co. |
| Unknown date | Ludlow | Barque | | Sunderland | United Kingdom | For J. Graham. |
| Unknown date | Maria | Snow | William Gales | Sunderland | United Kingdom | For Mr Thompson. |
| Unknown date | Mayflower | Merchantman | H. Dobinson | Sunderland | United Kingdom | For private owner. |
| Unknown date | Myrtle | Schooner | William Bonker | Salcombe | United Kingdom | For Weymouth & Co. |
| date | Noli me Tempere | Ship of the line | | Saint Petersburg | Russia | For Imperial Russian Navy. |
| Unknown date | Ocean | Merchantman | Tiffin | Sunderland | United Kingdom | For J. Dodds. |
| Unknown date | Prins Wilhelm Frederik Hendrik | Full-rigged ship | | Middelburg | Netherlands | For Royal Netherlands Navy. |
| Unknown date | Raby Castle | Snow | | Sunderland | United Kingdom | For Dixon & Co. |
| Unknown date | Reward | Brig | J. Hall | Sunderland | United Kingdom | For Parker & Co. |
| Unknown date | Royal William | Paddle steamer | | Pictou | (United Kingdom of Great Britain and Ireland) Upper Canada | For private owner. |
| Unknown date | Shannon | Schooner | | Bombay | India | For British East India Company. |
| Unknown date | Shannon | Snow | | Sunderland | United Kingdom | For private owner. |
| Unknown date | Sun | Snow | | Sunderland | United Kingdom | For White & Co. |
| Unknown date | Sunderland | Merchantman | William Gales | Sunderland | United Kingdom | For Andrew White. |
| Unknown date | Suphenius | Snow | William Gales | Sunderland | United Kingdom | For William Gales. |
| Unknown date | Themis | Merchantman | Tiffin | Sunderland | United Kingdom | For I. Tiffin. |
| Unknown date | Thomas Kennison | Snow | | Sunderland | United Kingdom | For private owner. |
| Unknown date | Tyneside | Snow | Philip Laing | Sunderland | United Kingdom | For T. Blackett, or Blackett, Forster & Co. |
| Unknown date | Tyrer | Full-rigged ship | | Sunderland | United Kingdom | For Tyrer & Co. |
| Unknown date | Useful | Brig | | Sunderland | United Kingdom | For Mr. Thompson. |
| Unknown date | Urania | Full-rigged ship | | Dunkerque | France | For Royal Netherlands Navy. |
| Unknown date | Van Speyk | Sixth rate | | Dunkerque | France | For Royal Netherlands Navy. |
| Unknown date | Vesper | Snow | William Potts | Sunderland | United Kingdom | For H. Hutton & Co. |
| Unknown date | Viatic | Snow | | | United Kingdom | For private owner. |
| Unknown date | Washington | Morris-Taney-class cutter | Webb and Allen | New York | United States | For United States Revenue Cutter Service. |
| Unknown date | Water Witch | Steamboat | | Otter Creek, Vermont | United States | For private owner. |
| Unknown date | Wave | Schooner | Brown and Bell | New York | United Kingdom | For United States Navy. |
| Unknown date | Westmoreland | Merchantman | | King's Lynn | United Kingdom | For private owner. |
| Unknown date | Woodlark | Barque | | | Burma | For private owner. |
