= List of ship launches in 1831 =

The list of ship launches in 1831 includes a chronological list of some ships launched in 1831.

Date	Ship	Class	Builder	Location	Country	Notes
22 January	Rapid	Passage boat	Wilson	Tophill	United Kingdom	For private owner.
30 January	Saracen	Cherokee-class brig-sloop		Plymouth Dockyard	United Kingdom	For Royal Navy.
31 January	Actaeon	Sixth rate		Portsmouth Dockyard	United Kingdom	For Royal Navy.
January	Earl Grey	Merchantman	William Gales	Sunderland	United Kingdom	For White & Sons.
January	Jane Dunn	Merchantman	John M. Gales	Sunderland	United Kingdom	For W. Dunn.
January	William Lee	Whaler	Dickes & Gibson	Hull	United Kingdom	For Lee & Co.
15 February	Nicholas the First	Steamship	Wallace	Blackwall, London	United Kingdom	For Lubec Steamship Company.
16 February	Transit	Steamship	Richard Pearson & Co.	Thorne	United Kingdom	For private owner.
28 February	Charybdis	Cherokee-class brig-sloop		Portsmouth Dockyard	United Kingdom	For Royal Navy.
28 February	Duke of Northumberland	Full-rigged ship		Newcastle upon Tyne	United Kingdom	For T. & W. Smith.
28 February	Fanny	Yacht		Portsmouth Dockyardd	United Kingdom	For Royal Navy.
February	John White	Merchantman	J. Brunton	Sunderland	United Kingdom	For White & Co.
14 March	Calcutta	Second rate		Bombay Dockyard	India	For Royal Navy.
14 March	Surprise	Paddle steamer	Henry Gilbert	Parramatta River	(United Kingdom of Great Britain and Ireland) New South Wales	For private owner.
16 March	Amulet	Brig	Dikes and Gibson	Kingston upon Hull	United Kingdom	For Ralph Wilkinson & Son.
30 March	Francis Jeffrey	Schooner	Adamson	Grangemouth	United Kingdom	For private owner.
March	Peg a Ramsey	Schooner yacht	Horatio Ross		United Kingdom	For Horatio Ross.
March	Reform	Merchantman	William Gales	Sunderland	United Kingdom	For Gales & Co.
March	Thomas & Joseph	Merchantman	William Gales	South Hylton	United Kingdom	For Parkin & Co.
9 April	Belgrave	Merchantman	Okell	Northwich	United Kingdom	For private owner.
9 April	Grosvenor	Merchantman	Okell	Northwich	United Kingdom	For private owner.
13 April	Elizabeth	Brig	Young & Son	South Shields	United Kingdom	For Messrs. Drybrough & Co.
13 April	Lord John Russel	Merchantman	George Kell & Sons	South Shields	United Kingdom	For private owner.
13 April	Speedwell	Merchantman	Young & Sons	South Shields	United Kingdom	For private owner.
14 April	Cordelia	East Indiaman	Steele & Co.	Liverpool	United Kingdom	For private owner.
14 April	Duke of Buccleugh	East Indiaman	Green, Wigram's & Green	Blackwall	United Kingdom	For Robert Green.
14 April	Water Witch	Yacht	Ritchie & McLaine	Belfast	United Kingdom	For John Echlin Matthews.
26 April	Sovereign	Steamship	Bolton & Humphrey	Hull	United Kingdom	For Messrs. Robert Keddy & Co.
27 April	Royal William	Paddle steamer	George Black and John Saxton Campbell	Quebec	(United Kingdom of Great Britain and Ireland) Upper Canada	For Quebec and Halifax Steam Navigation Company.
28 April	Pluto	Paddle steamer		Woolwich Dockyard	United Kingdom	For Royal Navy.
29 April	William the Fourth	Steamship	Duffus & Co.	Aberdeen	United Kingdom	For private owner.
April	Adelaide	Snow			United Kingdom	For private owner.
April	Sophia	Schooner		Aberdeen	United Kingdom	For private owner.
April	William	Schooner		Aberdeen	United Kingdom	For private owner.
12 May	Viper	Cockatrice-class schooner		Pembroke Dockyard	United Kingdom	For Royal Navy.
27 May	Queen Adelaide	Brig	R. & N. Campion	Whitby	United Kingdom	For private owner.
30 May	Don Juan	Schooner	Holme	Belfast	United Kingdom	For private owner.
16 June	Adelaide	Steamship	H. Smith	Gainsborough	United Kingdom	For private owner.
24 June	Imogene	Conway-class corvette		Pembroke Dockyard	United Kingdom	For Royal Navy.
5 July	Albion	Steamship		Bristol	United Kingdom	For Bristol Steam Packet Company.
11 July	Firebrand	Firebrand-class paddle steamer		Limehouse	United Kingdom	For Royal Navy.
27 July	Frank	Brig	Chaloner, Son & Co.	Liverpool	United Kingdom	For private owner.
27 July	Mona	Paddle steamer	John Wood & Co.	Port Glasgow	United Kingdom	For Isle of Man Steam Packet Company.
Unknown date	Mazeppa	Brig	T. & J. Brocklebank	Whitehaven	United Kingdom	For Thomas & John Brocklebank.
8 August	Lapwing	Schooner	William Mulvey	Chester	United Kingdom	For private owner.
23 August	Sapho	Ariane-class corvette		Saint Servan	France	For French Navy.
24 August	Hornet	Schooner		Chatham Dockyard	United Kingdom	For Royal Navy.
25 August	Fly	Fly-class ship-sloop		Pembroke Dockyard	United Kingdom	For Royal Navy.
26 August	Phœnix	Steamship	Smith	Gainsborough	United Kingdom	For private owner.
August	Eleanor	Merchantman	George Frater & Co.	Sunderland	United Kingdom	For Mr. Ledbetter.
August	Thomas & Hannah	Merchantman	William Gales	Sunderland	United Kingdom	For Mr. Longstaff.
7 September	Matthew Plummer	Barque	Edwards	South Shields	United Kingdom	For Plummer & Greenwell.
22 September	Thunderer	Canopus-class ship of the line		woolwich Dockyard	United Kingdom	For Royal Navy.
23 September	Généreux	Téméraire-class ship of the line		Cherbourg	United Kingdom	For French Navy.
23 September	Magnet	Brig	Henry & George Barrick	Whitby	United Kingdom	For Gideon Smales.
24 September	Ocean Queen	Full-rigged ship	John Longhorne & Co.	Hull	United Kingdom	For private owner.
6 October	Galathea	Corvette	Andreas Schifter	Gammelholm	Denmark	For Royal Danish Navy.
22 October	Jupiter	Bucentaure-class ship of the line	Jean Michel Segondat	Cherbourg	France	For French Navy.
26 October	Enterprise	Schooner		New York Navy Yard	United States	For United States Navy.
October	Catherine	Snow	George Kell	South Shields	United Kingdom	For private owner.
October	Echo	Merchantman	J. Burdon	Sunderland	United Kingdom	For private owner.
8 November	Harrier	Fly-class ship-sloop		Pembroke Dockyard	United Kingdom	For Royal Navy.
21 November	St. George	Steamship	Wilson & Sons	Liverpool	United Kingdom	For St. George Steam Packet Company.
22 November	Boxer	Schooner		Boston Navy Yard	United States	For United States Navy.
22 November	Seagull	Schooner		Chatham Dockyard	United Kingdom	For Royal Navy.
November	Maria	Market boat			United Kingdom	For private owner.
November	Sarah	Sloop			United Kingdom	For private owner.
Unknown date	Abeona	Sternwheeler		Pittsburgh, Pennsylvania	United States	For private owner.
Unknown date	Africaine	Barque	Robert & Thomas Brown Jr.	Jarrow	United Kingdom	For Mr. Fenwick.
Unknown date	Alston	Snow	W. and A. Adamson & Bell	Sunderland	United Kingdom	For W. Bell.
Unknown date	Beatitude	Snow	Peter Austin	Sunderland	United Kingdom	For .
Unknown date	Berbice	Barque	Messrs. Wilsons	Liverpool	United Kingdom	For private owner.
Unknown date	Blackaller	Merchantman		North Hylton	United Kingdom	For Mr. Blackaller.
Unknown date	Boreas	Sloop	John Ball Jr.	Salcombe	United Kingdom	For Robert Hurrell and others.
Unknown date	Castor	Merchantman	Philip Laing	Sunderland	United Kingdom	For Philip Laing.
Unknown date	Eleanor	Merchantman		Sunderland	United Kingdom	For Mr. Smith.
Unknown date	Eliza Ann	Merchantman	J. Brunton	Sunderland	United Kingdom	For private owner.
Unknown date	Frederick VI	Second rate			Denmark	For Royal Danish Navy.
Unknown date	Guiana	Merchantman	Philip Laing	Sunderland	United Kingdom	For Philip Laing.
Unknown date	Hamilton	Cutter		New York Navy Yard	United States	For United States Revenue Cutter Service.
Unknown date	Happy Return	Sloop	John Ball Jr.	Salcombe	United Kingdom	For William Blackmore.
Unknown date	Ianthe	Merchantman	William Gales	Sunderland	United Kingdom	For Robert Ord.
Unknown date	Jane Shirrefs	Merchantman		Hylton	United Kingdom	For Smith & Co.
Unknown date	John Frederick	Schooner	William Gales	Sunderland	United Kingdom	For William Gales.
Unknown date	Kent	Fishing trawler	Frederick Baddeley	Brixham	United Kingdom	For William White.
Unknown date	Lady Brougham	Schooner	John Ball Jr.	Salcombe	United Kingdom	For Thomas Forbes & others.
Unknown date	Lavinia	Merchantman	Peter Austin	Sunderland	United Kingdom	For private owner.
Unknown date	Lord Brougham	Merchantman	Allison	Sunderland	United Kingdom	For private owner.
Unknown date	Mary Ann	Schooner	Michael McDonald	Sunderland	United Kingdom	For private owner.
Unknown date	Morris	Morris-Taney-class cutter	Webb and Allen	New York	United States	For United States Revenue Cutter Service.
Unknown date	Naiad	Snow	W. Chilton	Sunderland	United Kingdom	For Hunter & Co.
Unknown date	North America	Packet ship		New York	United States	For Liverpool and Havre Line.
Unknown date	Osbert	Merchantman	Philip Laing	Sunderland	United Kingdom	For Philip Laing.
Unknown date	Pearl	Schooner	William Bonker	Salcombe	United Kingdom	For Robert Hurrell and others.
Unknown date	Pilot	Paddle tug	G. Potts	Sunderland	United Kingdom	For private owner.
Unknown date	Red Rover	Brig	Rowntree	Sunderland	United Kingdom	For private owner.
Unknown date	Redwing	Snow	William Potts	Sunderland	United Kingdom	For William Potts.
Unknown date	Reliance	Merchantman		Bristol	United Kingdom	For G. Hilhouse & Co.
Unknown date	Renovation	Brig	William Gales	Sunderland	United Kingdom	For Mr. Young.
Unknown date	Reward	Brig	J. Hall	Sunderland	United Kingdom	For Parker & Co.
Unknown date	Robert Raikes	Snow	Peter Austin	Sunderland	United Kingdom	For Thomas Speeding.
Unknown date	Robert Taylor	Merchantman		Sunderland	United Kingdom	For private owner.
Unknown date	Rose	Merchantman	William Gales	Sunderland	United Kingdom	For John Thompson.
Unknown date	Royal Mint	Barque	W. and A. Adamson & Bell	Sunderland	United Kingdom	For Bell & Co.
Unknown date	Rush	Morris-Taney-class cutter	Webb and Allen	New York	United States	For United States Revenue Cutter Service.
Unknown date	Sarah Ann	Schooner	Dorgin & Baily	Baltimore, Maryland	United States	For private owner.
Unknown date	Sedgefield	Merchantman	W. Wilkinson	Sunderland	United Kingdom	For T. Reed.
Unknown date	Sharp	Snow	J. Watson	Sunderland	United Kingdom	For C. Sharp.
Unknown date	Spring	Snow	J. Hutchinson	Sunderland	United Kingdom	For Hick & Co.
Unknown date	Sylph	Opium clipper	Currie & Co	Sulkea	India	For Rustomjee Cowasjee and others.
Unknown date	Theodosia	Snow	L. Crown	Sunderland	United Kingdom	For H. Metcalf.
Unknown date	Thomas Ferguson	Snow	William Potts	Sunderland	United Kingdom	For private owner.
Unknown date	Traveller	Sloop	John Ball Jr.	Salcombe	United Kingdom	For Mr. Blackmore.
Unknown date	William the Fourth	Paddle steamer	Marshall & Lowe	Erringhi	(United Kingdom of Great Britain and Ireland) New South Wales	For Joseph Hickey Grose.
Unknown date	Willey	Snow	L. Crown	Sunderland	United Kingdom	For M. Willey.
Unknown date	William Henry	Snow	Harrison & Oliver	Sunderland	United Kingdom	For private owner.
Unknown date	Wolcott	Morris-Taney-class cutter	Webb and Allen	New York	United States	For United States Revenue Cutter Service.
Unknown date	Zaan	Fourth rate		Dunkerque	France	For Royal Netherlands Navy.
