= Woodlark (disambiguation) =

A woodlark is a lark in the genus Lullula.

Woodlark may also refer to:

- Woodlark (ship)
  - HMS Woodlark (1808)
  - Woodlark (1819 ship)
  - Woodlark (1832 ship)
- Woodlark Building, in Portland, Oregon, U.S.
- Woodlark Island, an island of Papua New Guinea
- Woodlark cuscus, a species of marsupial
- Woodlark Plate, a tectonic plate in the eastern half of the island of New Guinea
