= Woodlark (ship) =

Several ships have been named Woodlark after the woodlark:

- HMS Woodlark (1808) was a Cherokee-class brig-sloop launched at Newcastle. She was sold into mercantile service in 1818 and then sailed as the mercantile Woodlark until the early 1830s.
- Woodlark (1819 ship) was launched at Rotherhithe. She initially traded with the Mediterranean but then switched to trading with Australia, the Dutch East Indies, and Singapore. She was wrecked in April 1828 while sailing from Australia to the Cape of Good Hope (CGH, or "the Cape") on her way to England.
- Woodlark (1832 ship) was launched at Moulmain. Circa 1835 she sailed to London and transferred to British registry. Between 1836 and 1844 she made two whaling voyages. In 1848 she transferred her ownership and registry to Sydney, from where, and New Zealand, she continued to sail until circa 1890–1891.
- Woodlark (1854 ship), of 289 tons (bm; New Act), was a brig built at Aberdeen. She was wrecked on 16 February 1868 while carrying cargo from Sydney to Newcastle, New South Wales.
- Woodlark (1870 ship), an iron sailing ship of 917 GRT, was built at Dundee. She made several voyages carrying emigrants from the UK to New Zealand.
- SS Woodlark (1871 ship), an iron screw-steamer of 886 GRT, was launched at Sunderland by Denton, Grey & Co. She was carrying grain to Rotterdam when on 15 November 1874 she ran aground and was wrecked off Hellevoetsluis.

== See also ==
- HMS Woodlark – any one of six vessels of the British Royal Navy
