= Sun (ship) =

Several ships have been named Sun:

- Sun (1819 ship) was a brig built in 1819 at Sunderland and was condemned at the Cape of Good Hope (the Cape) in August 1822. She was repaired and began sailing east of the Cape. She was wrecked in May 1826 in the Torres Strait.
- Sun (1832 ship) was launched at Sunderland. Her crew abandoned her at sea near Sable Island in 1836.
- Sun (1840 ship), of 242 tons burthen, was launched at Sunderland.
