= List of shipwrecks in April 1866 =

The list of shipwrecks in April 1866 includes ships sunk, foundered, grounded, or otherwise lost during April 1866.

== 1 April ==
List of shipwrecks: 1 April 1866
Ship	State	Description
Berbice	United Kingdom	The ship was wrecked.
Curlew	(United Kingdom of Great Britain and Ireland) New Zealand	The cutter was wrecked at Auckland wharf during a gale which raged from 30 March to 1 April.
Frederick H. Parker	(United Kingdom of Great Britain and Ireland) British North America	The barque was abandoned in the Atlantic Ocean. She was on a voyage from Saint John's, Newfoundland to Saint Thomas, Virgin Islands. She came ashore at "Boa Nova", Portugal on 17 February 1867.
Hind	United Kingdom	The brig ran aground on the Barnard Sand, in the North Sea off the coast of Suffolk. She was on a voyage from Hartlepool, County Durham to Rochester, Kent. She was refloated the next day and taken in to Lowestoft, Suffolk.
Martha	(United Kingdom of Great Britain and Ireland) New Zealand	The schooner was wrecked at Mechanics Bay, Auckland, during a gale which raged from 30 March to 1 April.
Rosara	United Kingdom	The brig sank.
Tenterden	United Kingdom	The brigantine was driven ashore and wrecked at Tynemouth, Northumberland. All seven people on board were rescued by rocket appartus and breeches buoy. Tenterden was on a voyage from Dundee, Forfarshire to Sunderland, County Durham. She was refloated on 17 April and towed in to the River Wear.
Tyne Lifeboat	Royal National Lifeboat Institution	The lifeboat was driven ashore and wrecked at Tynemouth whilst going to the aid of Tenterden (United Kingdom). Her crew survived.

== 2 April ==
List of shipwrecks: 2 April 1866
Ship	State	Description
Clara Morse	United States	The ship ran aground at Rangoon, Burma. She was on a voyage from Rangoon to a British port. She was refloated and put back to Rangoon.
Elise	United States	The ship was run down by a steamship and sank in the English Channel 4 nautical miles (7.4 km) off Portland Bill, Dorset, United Kingdom with the loss of eight of the nine people on board. She was on a voyage from New York to Bremerhaven.
Fame	United Kingdom	The schooner struck a submerged object and sank off the Runnel Stone, Devon. Her crew were rescued. She was on a voyage from a Welsh port to Plymouth, Devon.
Heatherbell	United Kingdom	The barque was wrecked at Port Said, Egypt.
Jackal	United Kingdom	The tugboat was severely damaged by fire at Blackwall, Middlesex.
Reena	Bremen	The jacht foundered in the North Sea. Her crew survived. She was on a voyage from Fredrikstad, Denmark to Bremen.

== 3 April ==
List of shipwrecks: 3 April 1866
Ship	State	Description
Æolus	Sweden	The barque was driven ashore and wrecked at Gilleleje, Denmark.
Bangor Packet	United Kingdom	The ship ran aground on the Dutchman's Bank, in the Irish Sea. She floated off and came ashore at Penmon, Anglesey. She had been refloated by 12 April and taken in to Bangor, Caernarfonshire.
Caribbean	United Kingdom	The steamship was severely damaged by the explosion of European (United Kingdom) at Aspinwall, United States of Colombia.
Clarinde	United Kingdom	The brig ran aground on the Swine Bottoms, in the Baltic Sea. She was on a voyage from Sunderland, County Durham to Danzig. She was refloated the next day and taken in to Helsingør, Denmark in a leaky condition.
European	United Kingdom	The steamship was destroyed by an explosion of glonoin oil and sank at Aspinwall with the loss of about 60 lives, including eleven of her crew.
Frederica Wilhelmina	Danzig	The ship was driven ashore on Rønne, Denmark. She was on a voyage from Danzig to London, United Kingdom.
Ionia	United Kingdom	The schooner collided with the steamship Hetton (United Kingdom) at Monkwearmouth, County Durham and was destroyed by fire when her cargo of quicklime got wet.
Llandulas	United Kingdom	The Mersey Flat was driven ashore at Llandulas, Caernarfonshire.
St. Lawrence	United Kingdom	The ship was abandoned in the Atlantic Ocean off the coast of Brazil. Her crew were rescued. She was on a voyage from the Lagos Colony to Liverpool, Lancashire.
Thankful	United Kingdom	The ship was driven ashore at Mazagan, Morocco. She had been refloated by 20 April.
Two Sisters	United Kingdom	The schooner was driven ashore in the River Dee. She was on a voyage from Dromore West, County Sligo to Liverpool, Lancashire.
Unnamed	United Kingdom	The Mersey Flat was driven ashore at Llandulas.

== 4 April ==
List of shipwrecks: 4 April 1866
Ship	State	Description
Elegante	(United Kingdom of Great Britain and Ireland) British North America	While en route from New York, United States to Liverpool, Lancashire with a cargo of oak, the vessel was abandoned by her crew in the Atlantic Ocean 100 nautical miles (190 km) west of the Isles of Scilly. They were rescued by Ferdinand (Bremen).
Hector	United Kingdom	The steamship ran aground on Lundy Island, Devon and was damaged. She was on a voyage from Liverpool, Lancashire to Cardiff, Glamorgan. She was refloated and completed her voyage.
Laughing Water	United Kingdom	The ship ran aground in the Hooghly River. She was refloated on 7 April and taken in to Calcutta, India.
Millbank	United Kingdom	The steamship ran aground in the River Avon at Bristol, Gloucestershire. She was on a voyage from Genoa, Italy to Valencia, Spain and Bristol. She was refloated.
Miss Evans	United Kingdom	The schooner was driven ashore at Dunkirk, Nord, France. She was on a voyage from Dunkirk to Bangor.
Rose	United Kingdom	The schooner was driven ashore near Westport, County Mayo. She was on a voyage from Liverpool to Westport.

== 5 April ==
List of shipwrecks: 5 April 1866
Ship	State	Description
Alice	United Kingdom	The schooner was driven ashore at Brook, Isle of Wight. She was on a voyage from Aberystwyth, Cardiganshire to Caen, Calvados, France. She was refloated.
Isabella Croll	United Kingdom	The steamship ran aground on the North Bank, in Liverpool Bay. She was on a voyage from Liverpool, Lancashire to Cardiff, Glamorgan. She was refloated and resumed her voyage.
Mary Elizabeth	United Kingdom	The schooner ran aground on the Longsand, in the North Sea off the coast of Essex. She was on a voyage from Ipswich, Suffolk to Ayr. She was refloated and taken in to Harwich, Essex in a leaky condition.

== 6 April ==
List of shipwrecks: 6 April 1866
Ship	State	Description
Amaranth	United Kingdom	The brig ran aground at Poole, Dorset. She was on a voyage from South Shields, County Durham to Poole. She was refloated and towed in to Poole.
Flora	United Kingdom	The ship was wrecked on a reef off Nuevitas, Cuba. Her crew were rescued. She was on a voyage from Liverpool, Lancashire to Havana, Cuba.
Mecklenburg	Rostock	The brig ran aground off Skagen, Denmark. She was on a voyage from the River Wear to Riga, Russia. She was refloated and resumed her voyage.
Patrick Henry	United Kingdom	The ship was driven ashore at Queenstown, County Cork. She was on a voyage from Liverpool, Lancashire to New York, United States. She was refloated but had to be beached.

== 7 April ==
List of shipwrecks: 7 April 1866
Ship	State	Description
Fontenary	Hamburg	The barque was lost south of the "Moscow Islands". She was on a voyage from Hong Kong to Rangoon, Burma.
Nemesis	United Kingdom	The barque was wrecked on Malden Island.

== 8 April ==
List of shipwrecks: 8 April 1866
Ship	State	Description
Berbice	United Kingdom	The barque foundered in the Atlantic Ocean. Her crew were rescued by the barque Alabama (United Kingdom). Herbice was on a voyage from Tayport, Fife to Quebec City, Province of Canada, British North America.
Helen McGregor	United Kingdom	The tug caught fire at Glasgow, Renfrewshire and was scuttled. She was refloated the next day and found to have been severely damaged.
Lady Russell	United Kingdom	The ship ran aground off Tybee Island, Georgia, United States. She was on a voyage from Savannah, Georgia to Liverpool, Lancashire. She was refloated and towed back to Savannah in a leaky condition.
Mary Jane	United Kingdom	The ship ran aground on the Colorados. She was on a voyage from Jamaica to the River Thames. She was refloated and resumed her voyage.
Thomasine	United Kingdom	The ship was driven ashore at Horsey, Norfolk. Her crew were rescued. She was on a voyage from South Shields, County Durham to Almería, Spain.

== 9 April ==
List of shipwrecks: 9 April 1866
Ship	State	Description
Isabella	United Kingdom	The ship was driven ashore at Cromer, Norfolk. She was on a voyage from Elie, Fife to Portsmouth, Hampshire. She was refloated the next day and towed in to Great Yarmouth, Norfolk.
Mary and Elizabeth	United Kingdom	The barque was driven ashore between Bacton and Mundesley, Norfolk. Her eleven crew were rescued by the Mundesley Lifeboat. She was on a voyage from Newcastle upon Tyne, Northumberland to Montreal, Province of Quebec, British North America. She was refloated on 12 April and towed in to Great Yarmouth, Norfolk in a leaky condition.
Shamrock	United Kingdom	The smack ran aground and was wrecked on the Dogger Bank, in the Irish Sea. Her crew were rescued by the Wexford Lifeboat.
Victory	United Kingdom	The ship was driven ashore near Wexford. She was on a voyage from Dublin to Penarth, Glamorgan.

== 10 April ==
List of shipwrecks: 10 April 1866
Ship	State	Description
Arthur	(United Kingdom of Great Britain and Ireland) British North America	The schooner was driven ashore and wrecked at Cape St. Mary's, Nova Scotia. Her crew were rescued. She was on a voyage from New York, United States to Saint John's, Newfoundland.
Douglas	(United Kingdom of Great Britain and Ireland) Isle of Man	The schooner collided with George Durker (Bremen) and sank in the Irish Sea. Her crew were rescued by George Durker. Douglas was on a voyage from Douglas to Swansea, Glamorgan.
Dred	Sweden	The ship departed from Liverpool, Lancashire for Wadsö. No further trace, presumed foundered with the loss of all hands.
Express	United Kingdom	The full-rigged ship was abandoned in the Atlantic Ocean. A crew member was rescued by the schooner Coalition ( (United Kingdom of Great Britain and Ireland) British North America. Express was on a voyage from New Orleans, Louisiana, United States to Saint John, New Brunswick, British North America.
George and Jane	United Kingdom	The ship was driven ashore and sank near Rhyl, Denbighshire. Her crew were rescued. She was on a voyage from Conway, Caernarfonshire to Liverpool, Lancashire.

== 11 April ==
List of shipwrecks: 11 April 1866
Ship	State	Description
Economy	United Kingdom	The dandy was run into by a brig and sank off Saltfleet, Lincolnshire. Both crew were rescued by Malcolm (United Kingdom). Economy was on a voyage from King's Lynn, Norfolk to Seaham, County Durham.
Ethel Bolton	United Kingdom	The ship ran aground at Morehead City, North Carolina, United States. She was on a voyage from Cardiff, Glamorgan to Morehead City. She was refloated and taken in to Norfolk, Virginia, United States, where she was repaired.
George	United Kingdom	The ship ran aground leaving Sunderland, County Durham and was damaged. She was refloated and put in to North Shields, Northumberland.

== 12 April ==
List of shipwrecks: 12 April 1866
Ship	State	Description
Bon St. Nicholas	France	The ship was driven ashore at Dundalk, County Louth, United Kingdom. She was on a voyage from Les Sables-d'Olonne, Vendée to Newry, County Antrim, United Kingdom.
Flora	Prussia	The ship ran aground on the Lemon and Ower Sand, in the North Sea. She was on a voyage from Danzig to Douglas, Isle of Man. She was refloated and out in to Great Yarmouth, Norfolk, United Kingdom in a leaky condition.
Gilmore	United Kingdom	The full-rigged ship was wrecked off St Martin's, Isles of Scilly. Her crew survived. She was on a voyage from Southampton, Hampshire to Quebec City, Province of Canada, British North America.
Isabella	United Kingdom	The ship was run into by Wakefield and was severely damaged at Grimsby, Lincolnshire.
Rose	United Kingdom	The schooner was abandoned in the Atlantic Ocean. Her crew were rescued by Themis (United Kingdom). Rose was on a voyage from Newport, Monmouthshire to Bilbao, Spain. Themis put five crew on board Rose; they took her in to Falmouth, Cornwall.

== 13 April ==
List of shipwrecks: 13 April 1866
Ship	State	Description
Apollo	Flag unknown	The brig was driven ashore and wrecked at Manila, Spanish East Indies.
Ceferina	Spain	The brig was driven ashore and wrecked at Manila.
Clansman	United Kingdom	The schooner was driven ashore and sank at St. Combs, Aberdeenshire. Her crew were rescued. She was on a voyage from Newcastle upon Tyne, Northumberland to Tain, Ross-shire.
Dextrous	United Kingdom	The fishing boat collided with the schooner Amelia (France) and sank in the North Sea off Burnmouth, Berwickshire with the loss of one of her six crew. Survivors were rescued by Amelia.
Jamaica Packet	(United Kingdom of Great Britain and Ireland) Jamaica	The ship was driven ashore at Absecon, New Jersey, United States. She was on a voyage from Kingston to New York, United States.
Lucienet	Spain	The brigantine was driven ashore and wrecked at Manila.
Tiempo	Spain	The ship was driven ashore and wrecked in Manila Bay. She was on a voyage from Shanghai, China to Manila.
Volunteer	United Kingdom	The ship was run down by a steamship off Southwold, Suffolk. Her crew were rescued.
Vriendschap	Netherlands	The ship departed from the River Tyne for Roskilde, Denmark. No further trace, presumed foundered with the loss of all hands.

== 14 April ==
List of shipwrecks: 14 April 1866
Ship	State	Description
Admiral Kanaris	United Kingdom	The steamship ran aground at Sunderland, County Durham. She was on a voyage from Middlesbrough, Yorkshire to Sunderland. She was refloated and towed in to Sunderland.
Amalia	Sweden	The schooner was driven against the pier at Sunderland. She put back to Sunderland for repairs.
George Turner	United States	The ship was destroyed by fire at New York.
John Wilson	United Kingdom	The brig was driven ashore on Skagen, Denmark. She was on a voyage from Newcastle upon Tyne, Northumberland to Stockholm, Sweden. She was refloated and resumed her voyage.
Tamar	(United Kingdom of Great Britain and Ireland) Tasmania	The ship was wrecked at Port Phillip Heads, Victoria with the loss of all but one of her crew.

== 15 April ==
List of shipwrecks: 15 April 1866
Ship	State	Description
Vigilant	United Kingdom	The schooner was run into by another vessel and was abandoned by her crew. She was on a voyage from Hartlepool, County Durham to Margate, Kent.

== 16 April ==
List of shipwrecks: 16 April 1866
Ship	State	Description
Colleen Bawn	United Kingdom	The ship was driven ashore near Algeciras, Spain. She was on a voyage from London to Alexandria, Egypt. She was refloated with the assistance of two tugs.
Dominica	United Kingdom	The ship was wrecked on the Jadder, in the North Sea. She was on a voyage from North Shields, Northumberland to Swinemünde, Prussia.
Emile	Prussia	The brig was driven ashore near Kastrup, Denmark. She was on a voyage from Stettin to West Hartlepool, County Durham, United Kingdom. She was refloated.
Favourite	United Kingdom	The ship was driven ashore on Skagen, Denmark. Her crew were rescued. She was on a voyage from Blyth, Northumberland to Karlshamn, Sweden. She was refloated the next day with assistance from a Danish steamship.
Irwell	United Kingdom	The steamship was beached at Grimsby, Lincolnshire.
Isabella	United Kingdom	The ship was driven ashore and wrecked at Ryde, Isle of Wight. She was on a voyage from Sunderland, County Durham to Emsworth, Hampshire.
Labouchere	Hudson's Bay Company	The steamship was wrecked at Point Reyes, California, United States with the loss of two lives. She was on a voyage from San Francisco, California to Victoria, British Columbia.
Nomaden	Norway	The brig was driven ashore on Skagen. She was on a voyage from Newcastle upon Tyne, Northumberland to Stockholm, Sweden. She was refloated the next day.
Wexford	United Kingdom	The ship was driven ashore at "Gelippia", Beylik of Tunis. She was on a voyage from Sulina, Ottoman Empire to Wexford. She was severely damaged in a gale on 26 April.

== 17 April ==
List of shipwrecks: 17 April 1866
Ship	State	Description
Louise	United Kingdom	The brig was driven ashore and damaged in Hornbeck Bay. She was on a voyage from Newcastle upon Tyne, Northumberland to Stockholm, Sweden. She was refloated on 30 April and taken in to Helsingør, Denmark.
Maria	Prussia	The ship ran aground near Wolgast. She was on a voyage from West Hartlepool, County Durham, United Kingdom to Wolgast.
Morning Star	(United Kingdom of Great Britain and Ireland) New Zealand	The schooner was wrecked on Stephenson Island while en route from Whangaroa to Auckland. All hands were saved.

== 18 April ==
List of shipwrecks: 18 April 1866
Ship	State	Description
Dryad	United Kingdom	The steamboat ran aground and sank in the River Thames near London Bridge. All on board were rescued. She was on a voyage from Hungerford Pier, London to Greenwich, Kent.
George	United Kingdom	The ship was abandoned in the North Sea. Her crew were rescued by Albert the Good (United Kingdom). George was discovered derelict off the coast of Jutland. She was towed in to Gothenburg, Sweden on 20 April by the steamship Volga (United Kingdom).
Prince of the Seas	United Kingdom	The barque was wrecked at Cape Recife, Cape Colony with the loss of seven of her fourteen crew. She was on a voyage from London to Algoa Bay.
Queen of the Seas	United Kingdom	The ship departed from Bassein, India for Falmouth, Cornwall. No further trace, presumed foundered with the loss of all hands.
Rescue	(United Kingdom of Great Britain and Ireland) Guernsey	The brigantine ran aground on the Pennington Spit, off the Isle of Wight. She was on a voyage from South Shields, County Durham to Brest, Finistère. France. She was refloated.
Shepherd	United Kingdom	The ship departed from Newcastle upon Tyne, Northumberland for Kronstadt, Russia. No further trace, presumed foundered with the loss of all hands.

== 19 April ==
List of shipwrecks: 19 April 1866
Ship	State	Description
Anna Maria	United Kingdom	The ship foundered off Adra, Spain. Her crew were rescued. She was on a voyage from Marseille, Bouches-du-Rhône, France to Wells-next-the-Sea, Norfolk.
Ceres	United Kingdom	The schooner was driven ashore and sank in the Haff, on the coast of Prussia. She was on a voyage from Wick, Caithness to Stettin.
Isabella	United Kingdom	The schooner collided with the steamship Brigadier (United Kingdom and sank in the River Thames downstream of Gravesend, Kent. Her crew were rescued.
Kawelen	Duchy of Holstein	The ship was abandoned in the Baltic Sea. Her crew were rescued by Cypress (United Kingdom). Kawelen was on a voyage from Tønsberg to Ventava, Courland Governorate.
Louisa Atwood	United States	The brig was abandoned. She was on a voyage from Galveston, Texas to Liverpool, Lancashire, United Kingdom.
Reaper	United Kingdom	The full-rigged ship was driven ashore at Akyab, Burma. She was on a voyage from Akyab to Calcutta, India. She was refloated and put back to Akyab.

== 20 April ==
List of shipwrecks: 20 April 1866
Ship	State	Description
Alma	United Kingdom	The ship was abandoned in the South Atlantic. Her crew were rescued. She was on a voyage from Liverpool, Lancashire to Panama City, United States of Colombia.
Ann	United Kingdom	The ship was wrecked on the Paternosters, in the Baltic Sea. Her crew were rescued.
Archibald McMillan	United Kingdom	The ship was driven ashore at Clachan Point, Isle of Arran. She was on a voyage from Bahia, Brazil to Liverpool, Lancashire.
Elizabeth and Jane	United Kingdom	The ship was driven ashore and wrecked at Macduff, Aberdeenshire.
Mary Campbell	United Kingdom	The sloop sank at Dundee, Forfarshire. She was refloated the next day and taken in to Tayport, Fife.
Venus	United Kingdom	The ship ran aground near Marstrand, Sweden. She was on a voyage from Hartlepool, County Durham to Swinemünde, Prussia.

== 21 April ==
List of shipwrecks: 21 April 1866
Ship	State	Description
Atkin	Sweden	The ship foundered off Söderhamn, Sweden. Her crew were rescued. She was on a voyage from the River Tyne to Gävle, Sweden.
Orange of Nassau	Netherlands	The ship put in to the Falkland Islands on fire and was scuttled. She was on a voyage from Glasgow, Renfrewshire, United Kingdom to San Francisco, California United States. She was consequently condemned.

== 22 April ==
List of shipwrecks: 22 April 1866
Ship	State	Description
Blossom	United Kingdom	The schooner ran aground and capsized at Hartlepool, County Durham. She was on a voyage from Inverness to Hartlepool.
Hoffnung	Prussia	The schooner ran aground in the Kiel Fjord. She was on a voyage from Sunderland, County Durham, United Kingdom to Kiel.
Rika Ann	Kingdom of Hanover	The koff ran aground on the Medam Sand, in the North Sea. she was on a voyage from Cuxhaven to Newcastle upon Tyne, Northumberland, United Kingdom.

== 23 April ==
List of shipwrecks: 23 April 1866
Ship	State	Description
Abby B	United States	The schooner ran aground and sank in the Savannah River near Fort Jackson, Savannah, Georgia.
Mary	United Kingdom	The schooner struck the breakwater and sank at Whitby, Yorkshire whilst avoiding a collision with Barbara (United Kingdom). Mary was on a voyage from Middlesbrough, Yorkshire to a Lincolnshire port. She was refloated and placed under repair.
Mayflower	United Kingdom	The brig ran aground on the Newcombe Sand, in the North Sea off the coast of Suffolk. She was on a voyage from South Shields, County Durham to Trouville-sur-Mer, Calvados, France. She was refloated and taken in to Lowestoft, Suffolk in a leaky condition.
Oporto	United Kingdom	The brig was abandoned in the Bay of Biscay. Her crew were rescued by Thia Elpis (Greece). She was on a voyage from Sines, Portugal to Glasgow, Renfrewshire.
Wilhelm	Prussia	The barque ran aground at Sunderland, County Durham, United Kingdom. She was on a voyage from Sunderland to London, United Kingdom. She was refloated and towed back to Sunderland.
Yarra	unknown	The 63-ton schooner was wrecked off the New Zealand coast.

== 24 April ==
List of shipwrecks: 24 April 1866
Ship	State	Description
Commodore	United Kingdom	The ship was sunk by ice in the Gulf of St. Lawrence. Her crew were rescued. She was on a voyage from Glasgow, Renfrewshire to Miramichi, New Brunswick, British North America.
Demetrio Fario	Austrian Empire	The brig caught fire at Buenos Aires, Argentina. Firefighting efforts by a French Navy and United States Navy warship were ineffectual and she was scuttled the next day.
Johannes Kepler	Rostock	The brig was driven ashore on Skagen, Denmark. She was on a voyage from Grangemouth, Stirlingshire, United Kingdom to Rostock. She was refloated and resumed her voyage.
Vibilia	(United Kingdom of Great Britain and Ireland) Guernsey	The ship ran aground on Scroby Sands, Norfolk. She was on a voyage from South Shields, County Durham to Torquay, Devon. She was refloated and resumed her voyage but was consequently towed in to Harwich, Essex in a severely leaky condition and was beached.
Unnamed	United Kingdom	The brig was sunk by ice off Seskar, Russia with the loss of all hands.

== 25 April ==
List of shipwrecks: 25 April 1866
Ship	State	Description
Black Diamond	United Kingdom	The steamship ran aground at Sunderland, County Durham. She was refloated, repaired and resumed her voyage.
Calphurnia	United Kingdom	The ship was abandoned in the Atlantic Ocean. Her crew were rescued by the brig Auguste (France). Calphurnia was on a voyage from Liverpool, Lancashire to Saint John, New Brunswick, British North America.
Cubana	United Kingdom	The barque struck the Seven Stones reef while both her master and mate were asleep below. She was bound for St Jago, Cuba, with sixteen crew, one passenger, and a cargo of coal, iron, and mining gear. Nine of her crew and the passenger took to one of the boats, rowed to the Sevenstones Lightship, ( Trinity House) and transferred to St Mary's, Isles of Scilly, by a pilot cutter. Seven crew drowned.
Express	United Kingdom	The fishing smack collided with the fishing smack Excelsior (United Kingdom) and sank in the North Sea off the coast of Norfolk. Her crew were rescued.
Heart of Oak	United Kingdom	The ship collided with the steamship Lady Jocelyn (United Kingdom) and sank with the loss of all but one of her crew. She was on a voyage from Cape Agulhas, Cape Colony to South Shields, County Durham.
Union	United Kingdom	The schooner was driven ashore and wrecked in North Bay. Her crew were rescued. She was on a voyage from Bangor to Wexford.

== 26 April ==
List of shipwrecks: 26 April 1866
Ship	State	Description
Denmark	United Kingdom	The barque foundered 170 nautical miles (310 km) off the Falkland Islands. Her crew were rescued by Matilda (United Kingdom).
Water Witch	United States	Overloaded with iron ore, the schooner sank in a storm on Lake Champlain. An infant on board was killed.
Weardale	United Kingdom	The ship was driven ashore near Thisted, Denmark. She was on a voyage from Sunderland, County Durham to Kronstadt, Russia. She was refloated and resumed her voyage.
Zephyr	United Kingdom	The steamship ran aground on the Schulhoek Bank, off the Dutch coast. She was on a voyage from London to Rotterdam, South Holland, Netherlands. She was refloated with the assistance of a tug and taken in to Hellevoetsluis, Zeeland, Netherlands.

== 28 April ==
List of shipwrecks: 28 April 1866
Ship	State	Description
Mentor	Prussia	The barque ran aground on the Haisborough Sands, in the North Sea off the coast of Norfolk, United Kingdom. She was on a voyage from Danzig to Belfast, County Antrim, United Kingdom. She was refloated and anchored in the Wold, but was consequently abandoned by her crew. Mentor was towed to Great Yarmouth, Norfolk by the steamship Seagull (United Kingdom).
Ocean Spray	United Kingdom	The barque was abandoned in the Atlantic Ocean (45°00′N 19°35′W). Her crew were rescued by the full-rigged ship James Russell (United Kingdom). Ocean Spray subsequently foundered. She was on a voyage from Cádiz, Spain to Saint John's, Newfoundland, British North America.
Undaunted	(United Kingdom of Great Britain and Ireland) British North America	The brigantine was driven ashore at Prospect, Nova Scotia. She was on a voyage from Matanzas, Cuba to Halifax, Nova Scotia.

== 29 April ==
List of shipwrecks: 29 April 1866
Ship	State	Description
Bolivian	United Kingdom	The steamship was driven ashore at Abacoa, Florida, United States. She was on a voyage from Liverpool, Lancashire to New Orleans, Louisiana, United States. She was refloated and resumed her voyage.
Charm	United Kingdom	The ship was driven ashore at Breaksea Point, Glamorgan.
Crosby	United Kingdom	The ship sprang a leak and was beached near Bridlington, Yorkshire. She was on a voyage from Middlesbrough, Yorkshire to Rotterdam, South Holland, Netherlands. She broke up the next day.
Cruiser	United Kingdom	The brig was driven ashore on Skagen, Denmark. She was on a voyage from Hartlepool, County Durham to Swinemünde, Prussia. She was refloated and resumed her voyage.
Eliza	United Kingdom	The brig was driven ashore at Løkken-Vrå, Denmark. She was on a voyage from South Shields, County Durham to Kronstadt, Russia.
Express	United Kingdom	The ship foundered in the English Channel off the coast of Dorset. Her crew were rescued by Victoria (Norway). Express was on a voyage from Guernsey, Channel Islands to London.
Flying Scud	United Kingdom	The schooner ran aground on the Shipwash Sand, in the North Sea off the coast of Suffolk. She was on a voyage from Hull, Yorkshire to Tenerife, Canary Islands. She was refloated and assisted in to Harwich, Essex in a severely leaky condition.
Good Intent	United Kingdom	The schooner foundered 30 nautical miles (56 km) north of Trevose Head, Cornwall. Her crew were rescued. She was on a voyage from Amlwch, Anglesey to Newcastle upon Tyne, Northumberland.
Melita	United Kingdom	The barque was driven ashore near Ballyhack, County Wexford. She was on a voyage from Waterford to Cardiff, Glamorgan.
Sir Charles Napier	Norway	The ship was driven ashore and wrecked at Lemvig, Denmark. She was on a voyage from Rouen, Seine-Inférieure, France to Christiania.

== 30 April ==
List of shipwrecks: 30 April 1866
Ship	State	Description
Acorn or Alberdina	United Kingdom	One of the ships ran aground on the Spykerplaat, off the coast of Zeeland, Netherlands.
Hero	United Kingdom	The schooner was driven ashore on the Sands Heads, Isle of Wight. She was on a voyage from Sunderland, County Durham to Ryde, Isle of Wight. She was refloated and taken in to Ryde for repairs.
Lord Lyndhurst	United Kingdom	The ship was driven ashore at Point Huges, South Australia. She was on a voyage from Wallaroo, South Australia to Swansea, Glamorgan. She was refloated the next day and resumed her voyage.
Progress	United Kingdom	The barque sprang a leak and foundered in the English Channel 20 nautical miles (37 km) south west of Portland, Dorset. Her crew were rescued by a fishing smack. She was on a voyage from South Shields, County Durham to Civita Vecchia, Papal States.
Reubens	United Kingdom	The galiot was driven ashore at Monlochy, Moray. She was on a voyage from Leith, Lothian to Monlochy. She was refloated and taken in to Monlochy in a severely damaged condition.
William VI	United Kingdom	The ship ran aground on the Pennington Spit, off the Isle of Wight. She was on a voyage from Cardiff, Glamorgan to Ryde, Isle of Wight.

== Unknown date ==
List of shipwrecks: Unknown date in April 1866
Ship	State	Description
Amalia	United Kingdom	The ship was wrecked on Barbuda. She was on a voyage from London to Saint Kitts.
Ann	United Kingdom	The ship was driven ashore in the Baltic Sea.
Bitter Beer	(United Kingdom of Great Britain and Ireland) South Australia	The schooner departed from Warrnambool, Victoria for Adelaide in early April. Believed to have foundered before 16 April, when a message in a bottle from the ship was found.
Carmen	United Kingdom	The barque was wrecked at La Guaira, Venezuela before 12 April. She was on a voyage from the Turks Islands to Frontera, Mexico.
Carolie	United Kingdom	The ship ran aground on the Barnard Sand, in the North Sea off the coast of Suffolk. She was on a voyage from South Shields, County Durham to Exeter, Devon. She was refloated and put in to Great Yarmouth, Norfolk.
Ellida	Norway	The schooner was driven ashore on Skagen, Denmark before 30 April. She was refloated but drove ashore again and was wrecked.
Elongra	(United Kingdom of Great Britain and Ireland) New Zealand	The steamship was wrecked at the mouth of the Grey River before 11 April.
Fairlie	United Kingdom	The ship foundered in the Indian Ocean 150 nautical miles (280 km) off Negapatam, India. Her crew took to a raft; they were rescued by Innisfallen (United Kingdom). Fairlie was on a voyage from London to an Indian port.
Fanny	United Kingdom	The ship was wrecked in the Rio Grande before 16 April. She was on a voyage from Newcastle upon Tyne, Northumberland to the rio Grande.
Grecian	United Kingdom	The steamship ran aground at Trieste. She on a voyage from Trieste to Liverpool, Lancashire. She was refloated.
Hamilton	United Kingdom	The brig was driven ashore at Ballywalter, County Down. She was refloated on 4 April and towed in to Belfast, County Antrim.
H. E. Spearing	United Kingdom	The ship caught fire and was abandoned before 21 April. She was on a voyage from Galveston, Texas, United States to London.
xxxx	United Kingdom	The ship.
Howard	United Kingdom	The ship foundered before 5 April. Her crew were rescued by Douglas Castle (United Kingdom).
Isabella	United Kingdom	The ship sank in the Sundhamma Inlet. She was on a voyage from the River Tyne to Gävle, Sweden.
John Rutherford	United Kingdom	The ship was wrecked near the Nieuwe Diep. Her crew were rescued. She was on a voyage from South Shields to the Nieuwe Diep.
Juno	United Kingdom	The barque was abandoned in the Atlantic Ocean before 18 April.
Leda	United Kingdom	The ship was wrecked in the Baltic Sea.
Mandarin	(United Kingdom of Great Britain and Ireland) Victoria	The barque was wrecked near Wilsons Promontory. She was on a voyage from Melbourne to Newcastle, New South Wales.
Minerva	United Kingdom	The schooner was run down and sunk by Pathway (United States). Minerva was on a voyage form New York to Norfolk, Virginia, United States.
Princess of Wales	United Kingdom	The ship ran aground in the Sea of Marmara. She was on a voyage from the Danube to a British port. She was refloated.
Quickstep	(United Kingdom of Great Britain and Ireland) New Zealand	The cutter was lost while en route from Manukau to Greymouth. Wreckage was found near Waiuku.
Sea Bird	(United Kingdom of Great Britain and Ireland) British North America	The brig was abandoned in the Atlantic Ocean before 21 April.
Simla	United States	The full-rigged ship was driven ashore on Frigate Beach, New Jersey. She was on a voyage from Calcutta, India to New York. She was refloated.
Sirius	Hamburg	The brig was wrecked on the Roncadora Reef before 28 April. Her crew survived. She was on a voyage from Panama City, United States of Colombia to Santa Martha.
St. Oswin	United Kingdom	The steamship was driven ashore at Seraglio Point, Ottoman Empire with the loss of two of her crew. She was on a voyage from Galaţi, Ottoman Empire to London. She was refloated on 30 April.
Vera Cruz	Mexico	The steamship was wrecked. All on board were rescued. She was on a voyage from New York to Veracruz.
