= HMS Viper (1831) =

History

United Kingdom
- Name: Viper
- Namesake: Viper
- Ordered: 11 September 1828
- Builder: Pembroke Dockyard
- Laid down: June 1830
- Launched: 12 May 1831
- Completed: 31 August 1831
- Reclassified: As packet boat, 1831
- Fate: Broken up, May 1851

General characteristics
- Class & type: Cockatrice-class schooner
- Tons burthen: 18135/94 bm
- Length: 80 ft (24.4 m) (gundeck); 64 ft 6 in (19.7 m) (keel)
- Beam: 23 ft 3 in (7.1 m)
- Draught: 9 ft 5 in (2.9 m)
- Depth: 9 ft 11 in (3.0 m)
- Sail plan: brigantine rig
- Complement: 33–42
- Armament: 2 × 6-pdr cannon; 4 × 12-pdr carronades

HMS Viper was a six-gun Cockatrice-class schooner built for the Royal Navy during the 1830s. She was sold for scrap in 1851.

== Description ==
Viper had a length at the gundeck of 80 feet (24.4 m) and 64 feet 6 inches (19.7 m) at the keel. She had a beam of 23 feet 3 inches (7.1 m), a draught of about 9 feet 5 inches (2.9 m) and a depth of hold of 9 feet 11 inches (3.0 m). The ship's tonnage was 181 35/94 tons burthen. The Cockatrice class was armed with two 6-pounder cannon and four 12-pounder carronades. The ships had a crew of 33–42 officers and ratings.

== Construction and career ==
Viper, the twelfth ship of her name to serve in the Royal Navy, was ordered on 11 September 1828, laid down in June 1820 at Pembroke Dockyard, Wales, and launched on 12 May 1831. She was completed on 31 August 1831 at Plymouth Dockyard.
