= Warrior (steamboat) =

Ship used during the Black Hawk War

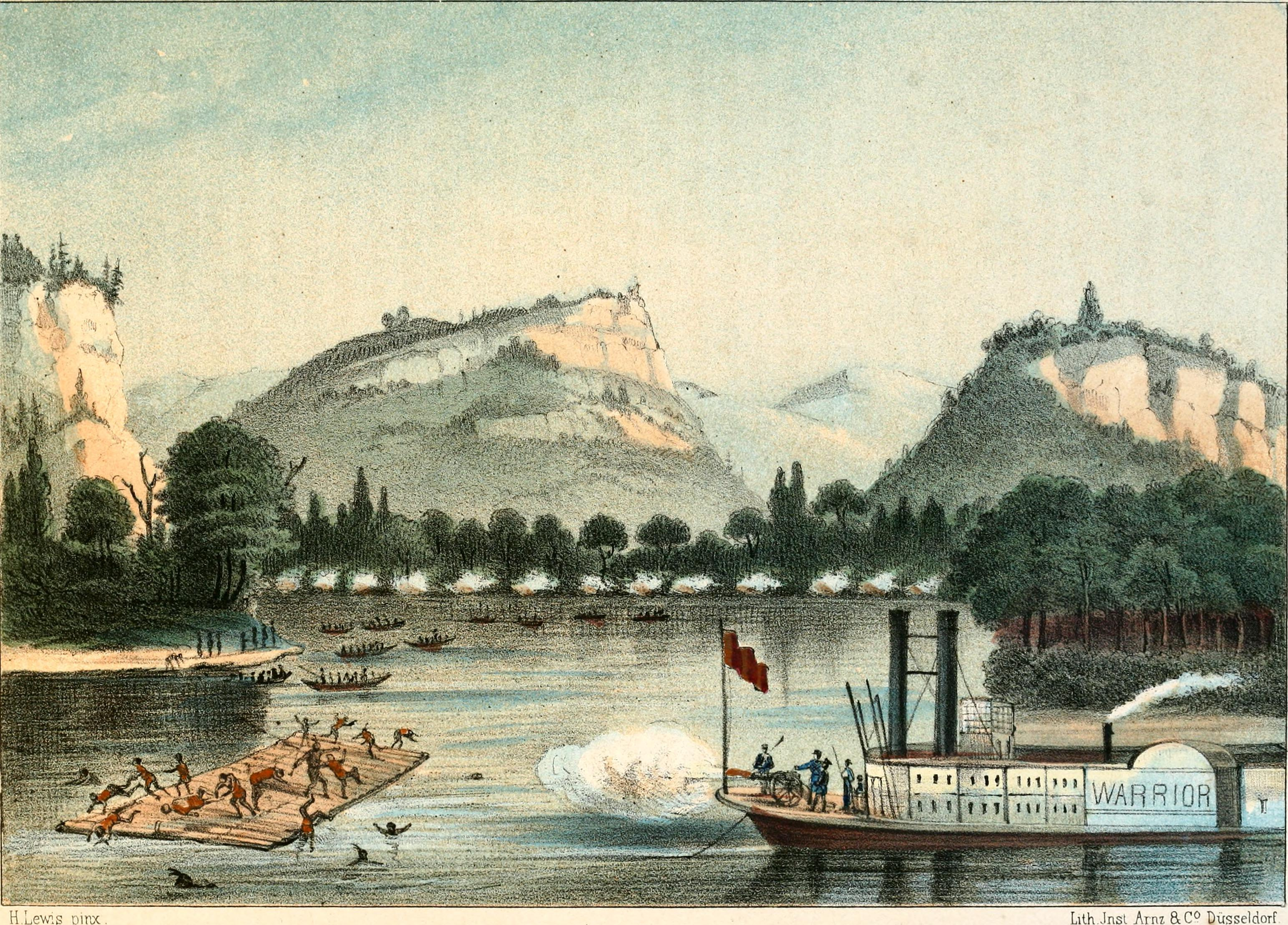
- Warrior at the Battle of Bad Axe

History

United States
- Builder: Joseph Throckmorton
- Laid down: 1832
- Launched: 1832
- In service: mid-summer 1832
- Homeport: St. Louis

General characteristics
- Length: 111 feet (33.8 m)
- Boats & landing craft carried: passenger barge
- Complement: 3 crew; 23 soldiers: (2 officers, 15 federal Army troops and 6 volunteer militia)
- Armament: 6 pound cannon

Warrior was a privately owned and constructed steamboat that was pressed into service by the U.S. government during the Black Hawk War to assist with military operations. Warrior was constructed and launched in 1832 at Pittsburgh, Pennsylvania by Joseph Throckmorton who also served as the vessel's captain. Once constructed the vessel traveled to St. Louis and into the war zone. Warrior played a key role in the decisive Battle of Bad Axe. Following the war the steamboat continued its service under Throckmorton along the Upper Mississippi River.

== Launching ==
The steamboat Warrior was both privately built and owned. The 111-foot (33.8 m) boat was built by Joseph Throckmorton, who also owned the vessel in a partnership with Galena, Illinois resident William Hempstead. It was launched in Pittsburgh during the summer of 1832 with Captain Throckmorton at the helm. The side wheeled vessel had no cabin or accommodations for passengers but towed behind it a barge meant for passengers. Throckmorton brought the new boat and its barge to St. Louis and then set out for the war zone by mid-summer 1832.

== Black Hawk War ==
=== Background ===
As a consequence of an 1804 treaty between the governor of Indiana Territory and a group of Sauk and Fox leaders regarding land settlement, the tribes vacated their lands in Illinois and moved west of the Mississippi in 1828. However, Sauk Chief Black Hawk and others disputed the treaty, claiming that the full tribal councils had not been consulted, nor did those representing the tribes have authorization to cede lands. Angered by the loss of his birthplace, between 1830–31 Black Hawk led a number of incursions across the Mississippi River into Illinois, but was persuaded each time to return west without bloodshed. In April 1832, encouraged by promises of alliance with other tribes and the British, he again moved his so-called "British Band" of around 1,000 warriors and non-combatants into Illinois. Finding no allies, he attempted to return across the Mississippi (to present-day Iowa), but the undisciplined Illinois Militia's actions led to the Battle of Stillman's Run. A number of other engagements followed, and the militia of Michigan Territory and the state of Illinois were mobilized to hunt down Black Hawk's band. The conflict became known as the Black Hawk War.

The Warrior was one of several steamboats pressed into service by the U.S. government for use by military forces after the outbreak of the 1832 Black Hawk War. Warrior was used mostly as a troop transport during the war but it played a key role in the war's final battle. Some of the other steamboats utilized during the war included the Chieftain and the Enterprise.

=== Battle of Bad Axe ===
A few days before the decisive Battle of Bad Axe, Warrior was chartered by a United States Army major at Prairie du Chien, Wisconsin for the purpose of delivering a message to the Sioux tribe. Lieutenant James W. Kingsbury, and Lieutenant Reuben Holmes were then ordered to take 15 U.S. Army troops, and six militia volunteers on board the vessel and head northward, toward the village of Sioux chief Wabasha. The men loaded a six-pound cannon and ammunition on the steamboat and set out to deliver the message that the Sauk and Fox were fleeing the U.S. forces. The meeting was an attempt to gain the alliance of Wabasha's warriors on the west side of the Mississippi River.

While returning from this mission on August 1, the vessel came across the remnants of Black Hawk's British Band attempting to cross the Mississippi River and flee the pursuing militia force. Waving a white flag, Black Hawk tried to surrender, but as had happened in the past the soldiers failed to understand and the scene deteriorated into battle. The warriors who survived the initial volley found cover, returned fire and a two-hour firefight ensued. The Warrior eventually withdrew from battle, due to lack of fuel, and returned to Fort Crawford at Prairie du Chien.

Black Hawk and the other British Band leaders fled during the night and on August 2 militia and federal troops attacked the remnants of the group at the mouth of the Bad Axe River. Warrior returned after obtaining more wood in Prairie du Chien, leaving the refueling point about midnight and arriving at Bad Axe about 10 a.m. The battle had already commenced when the steamboat arrived and it joined in on a slaughter that lasted the next eight hours. Following the battle the Warrior carried Henry Atkinson and his staff to Fort Crawford where they met with Zachary Taylor, and after a short trip General Winfield Scott.

== Later service ==
Following the defeat of Chief Black Hawk, Throckmorton continued to operate Warrior on the Upper Mississippi River for several years. Historical records indicated that on June 24, 1835 the steamboat Warrior arrived at Fort Snelling, Minnesota with supplies and a party of tourists. The vessel's crew at the time still included Captain Throckmorton, as well as clerk E.H. Gleim, and pilot William White. Among the notable passengers on the list were, George Wallace Jones, Marie Pauline Gregorie, who was the widow of slain U.S. Indian Agent Felix St. Vrain, and artist George Catlin. Warrior arrived at Fort Snelling again on July 16. During the 1830s the Warrior was one of about 12 vessels that carried large amounts of supplies, mostly food and clothing, to Fort Snelling.

Old newspapers in Galena, Illinois also give some indication of the Warrior's activity in the few years after the Black Hawk War. In the fall of 1835 The Galena Advertiser reported that river navigation was closed as of November 7 and that the Warrior, along with the steamboat Galena, had departed for Pittsburgh. Navigation reopened, after the winter, in April 1836, and the Advertiser stated that the Warrior was one of several vessels that had departed for St. Louis.
