= HMS Conway (1832) =

Conway-class sixth rate of the Royal Navy

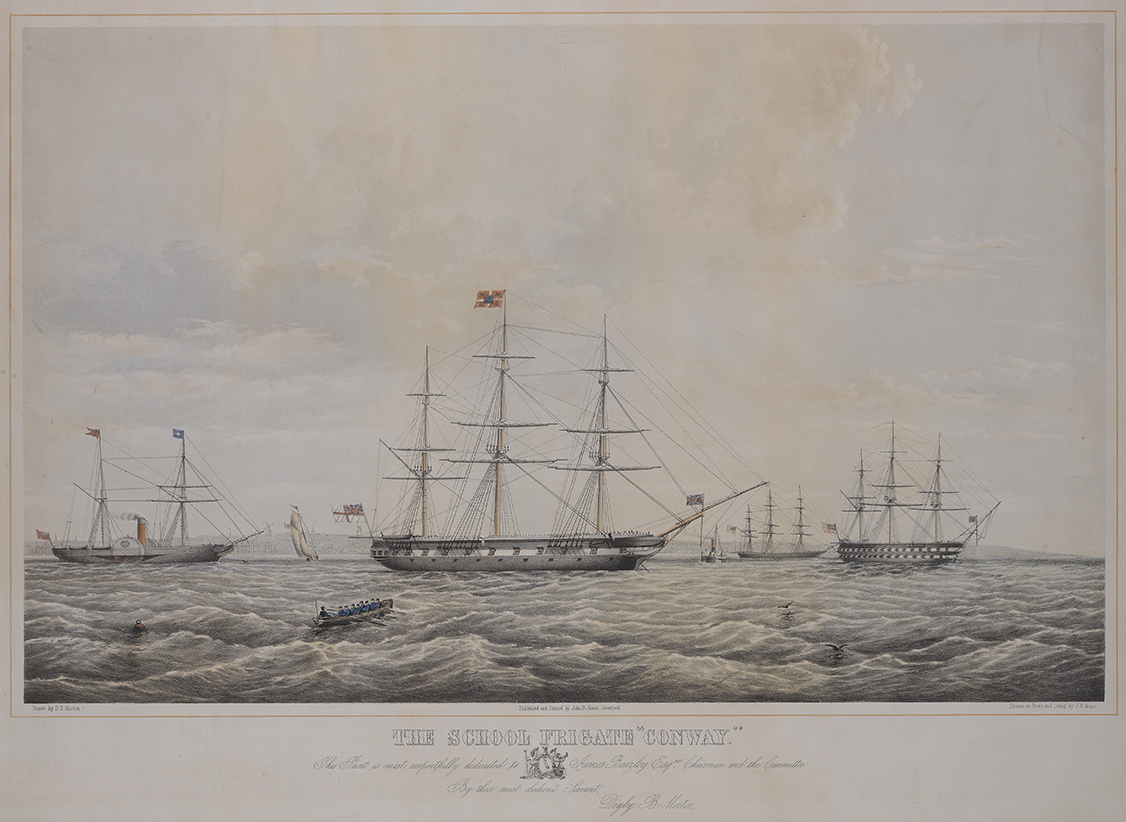
- The school frigate Conway ca. 1832, by John R. Isaac of Liverpool, after Capt. Digby B. Morton R.N.

History

United Kingdom
- Name: HMS Conway
- Ordered: 9 June 1825
- Builder: Chatham Dockyard
- Laid down: December 1829
- Launched: 2 February 1832
- Commissioned: 11 May 1832
- Fate: Lent as training ship in February 1859; Aberdeen Royal Naval Reserve on 28 August 1861 (as Winchester); Broken up at Sheerness in 1871

General characteristics
- Class & type: Conway-class corvette (initially classed as a sixth rate)
- Tons burthen: 651 74/94 bm
- Length: 125 ft (38 m) (gundeck); 106 ft (32 m) (keel)
- Beam: 34 ft 5 in (10.49 m)
- Depth of hold: 10 ft (3.0 m)
- Sail plan: Full-rigged ship
- Complement: 175
- Armament: Upper deck: 20 × 32-pounder carronades; Quarterdeck: 6 × 18-pounder carronades; Focsle: 2 × 9-pounder cannon

HMS Conway was a Conway-class sixth rate of the Royal Navy, built by Chatham Dockyard and launched on 2 February 1832. She was lent to the Mercantile Marine Association of Liverpool in February 1859 to act as a training ship for boys, and gave her name to HMS Conway, ultimately a series of three ships and then from 1964 to 1974 a shore-based school. When Winchester took her place as the training ship in 1861, the two ships swapped names. Under her new name of Winchester she became the Aberdeen Royal Naval Reserve ship on 28 August 1861.

== Design and construction ==
Designed by Sir Robert Seppings in 1828, the Conway class were a broader version of HMS Tyne of 1826. They were intended as sixth rates, which placed them in a category of ships with more than 24 but less than 36 guns, and commanded by an officer of the rank of captain.

These ships were constructed of wood in traditional shipbuilding fashion, although iron braces and trussed were used for increased longitudinal strength. They were armed with a traditional arrangement of broadside, smoothbore muzzle-loading guns, and in common with contemporary Royal Navy practice for small ships, these guns were carronades (with the exception of a pair of small long guns on the focsle as chasers). Twenty 32-pounder carronades were mounted on the upper deck and a further six 18-pounder carronades were placed on the quarterdeck. The sail plan was an entirely conventional ship rig, and they were complemented with 175 men and boys.

== Fate ==
She was broken up at Sheerness in 1871, a process that was completed on 3 June 1871.
