= HMS Andromache (1832) =

Frigate of the Royal Navy

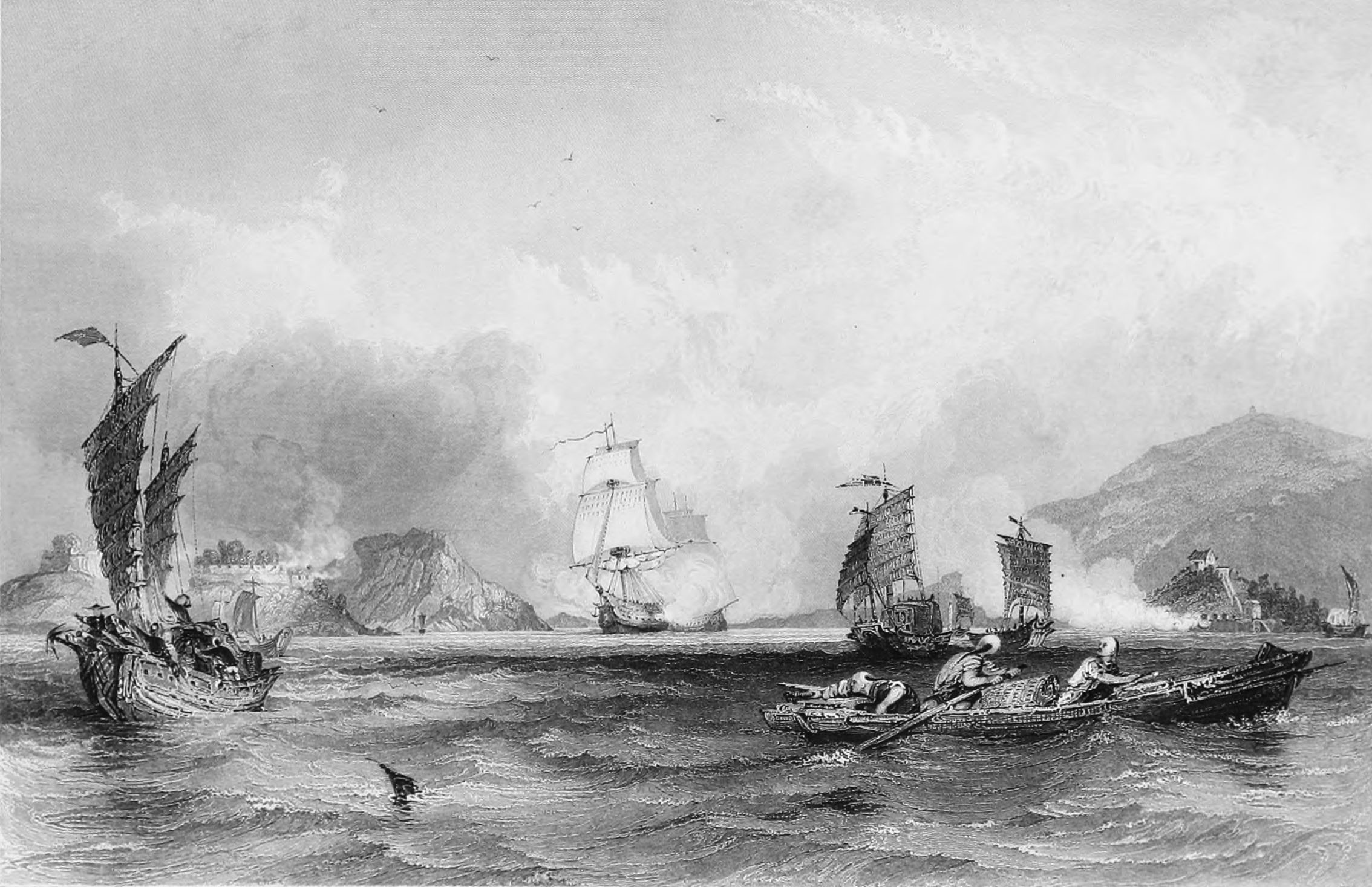
- HMS Imogene and Andromache passing the batteries of the Bocca Tigris in China, 1834

History

United Kingdom
- Name: HMS Andromache
- Namesake: Andromache
- Ordered: 29 October 1830
- Builder: Pembroke Dockyard
- Cost: £14,845 plus £7,759 for fitting
- Laid down: August 1831
- Launched: 27 August 1832
- Commissioned: 19 September 1833
- Fate: Provision hulk at Plymouth in 1846; Powder depot in 1854; Broken up at Plymouth in March 1875

General characteristics
- Class & type: Andromache-class sixth-rate frigate (later "corvette")
- Tons burthen: 717 73/94 bm
- Length: 130 ft 0 in (39.6 m) (gundeck); 108 ft 8.75 in (33.1 m) (keel)
- Beam: 35 ft 6.75 in (10.8 m)
- Depth of hold: 10 ft 6.5 in (3.2 m)
- Sail plan: Full-rigged ship
- Complement: 175
- Armament: Upperdeck: 20 × 32-pounder gunnades; Quarterdeck: 6 × 32-pounder gunnades; Foc's'le: 2 × 32-pounder gunnades

HMS Andromache was a 28-gun sixth rate launched in 1832. She was assigned to the North America and West Indies Station, based at the Imperial fortress colony of Bermuda in 1838.

She was converted to a powder hulk in 1854 and was broken up in 1875.

She took William Napier to China and participated in the war with China at Canton in 1834.
