= HMS Black Eagle =

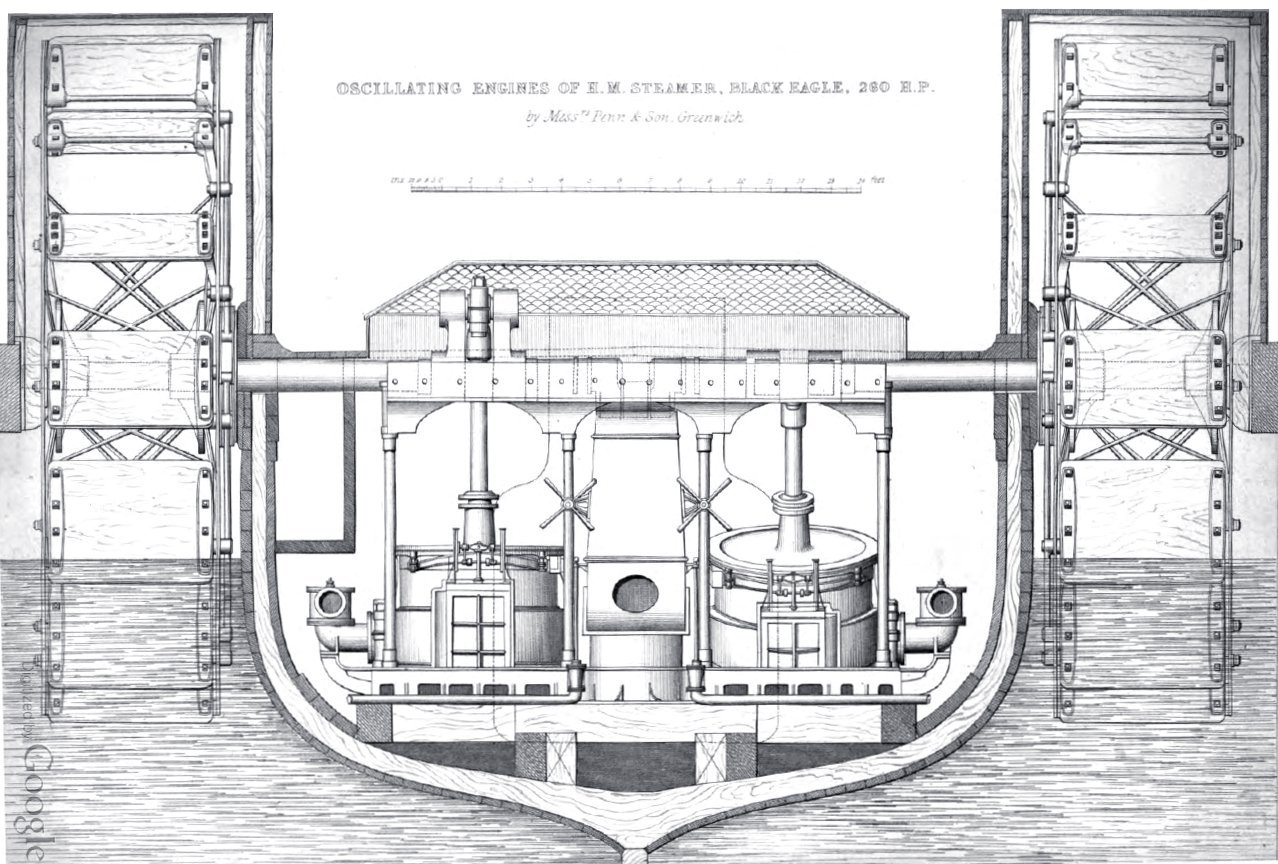
- Oscillating paddlewheel engines of HMS Black Eagle

History

United Kingdom
- Name: Firebrand (1831–1843); Black Eagle (1843–1876)
- Ordered: 28 January 1831
- Builder: Merchant's yard, Limehouse
- Cost: £19,964
- Laid down: April 1831
- Launched: 11 July 1831
- Commissioned: 11 July 1831
- Fate: Broken up, March 1876

General characteristics
- Class & type: Firebrand-class steam vessel
- Displacement: As built: 510 long tons (520 t)
- Tons burthen: As built: 495 bm From 1843: 540 bm
- Length: As built: 155 ft 3 in (47.3 m); From 1843: 168 ft 3 in (51.3 m)
- Beam: 26 ft 5 in (8.1 m)
- Depth of hold: 14 ft 10 in (4.5 m)
- Propulsion: As built: Butterley & Co. 140 nhp 2-cylinder side lever steam engine; Paddle wheel; From 1833: Maudslay 120 nhp steam engine; Morgan paddlewheels; From 1843: 'Tubulous boilers'; Penn 260 nhp steam engine; Paddlewheels
- Complement: 80
- Armament: As built: 6 × 9-pounder (13 1/2cwt) gun; Later: 1 × 32-pounder (25cwt) pivot gun; 2 × 32-pounder (17cwt) carronades

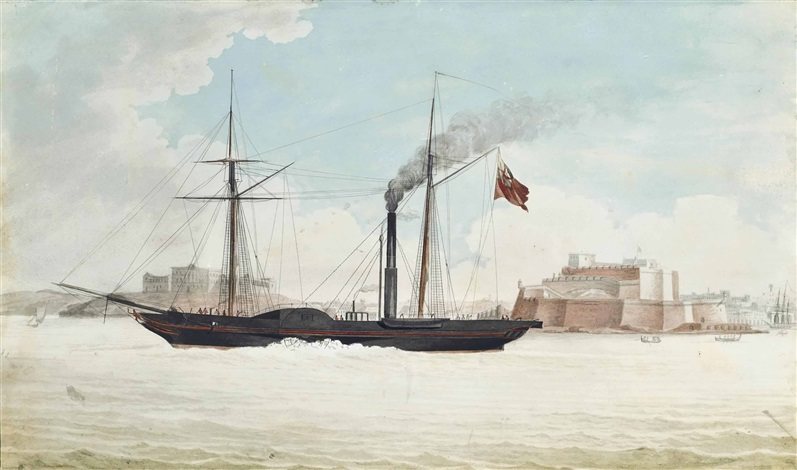
Firebrand emerging from Grand Harbour, Valetta, Malta, 1832, by Nicolas S. Cammillieri

HMS Firebrand was a wooden paddle vessel launched in 1831. She was rebuilt in 1843, renamed HMS Black Eagle and employed as an Admiralty steam yacht. She was broken up in 1876.

== Construction and rebuild ==
Built at Merchant's Yard, Limehouse as a wooden paddle vessel, Firebrand was launched on 11 July 1831. In 1832 her original Butterley side lever steam engine was removed and replaced in 1833 by a Maudsley, and Morgan's paddlewheels were fitted. She was rebuilt in 1843, gaining 13 feet (4.0 m) in length, and receiving an oscillating engine manufactured by John Penn and Sons. Notably, Penn doubled the power output without increasing either the weight or space occupied. On 29 October 1853, she assisted in the refloating of HMS Rodney, which had run aground in the Dardanelles. Firebrand was renamed Black Eagle on 5 February 1842.

In 1856, the Black Eagle and the paddle-wheel troopship Dee were used in a trial of J Wethered's apparatus for superheated steam. This produced an economy of fuel of 18% in the Black Eagle, and 31% in the Dee.

== Royal yacht ==
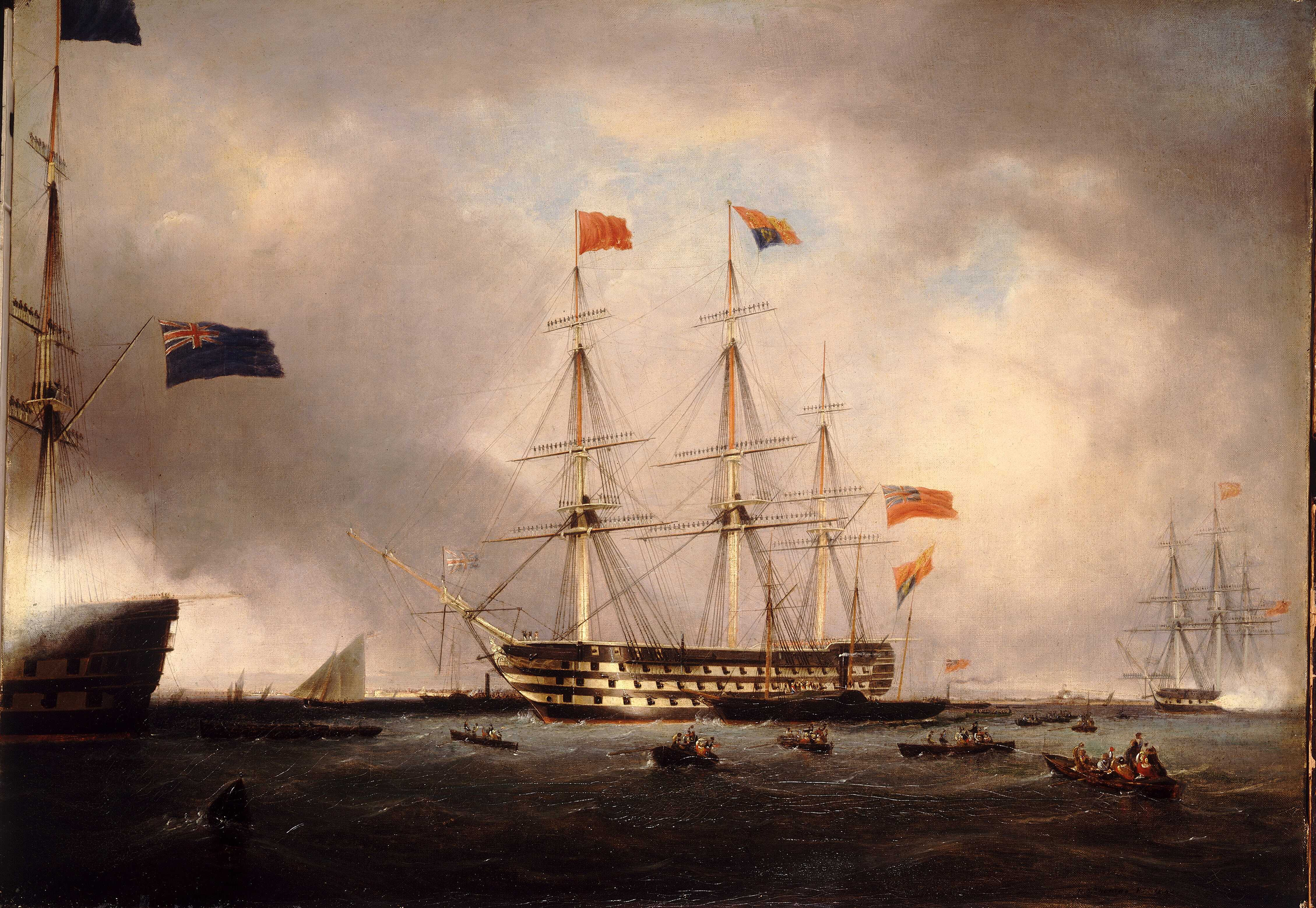
Queen Victoria embarking from the Black Eagle on her visit to HMS Queen at Portsmouth, 1 March 1842

She was based at Woolwich in south-east London and was part of the Royal Squadron alongside the royal yacht. The Black Eagle was eventually broken up at Portsmouth in March 1876. A model of the vessel is in the collection of the National Maritime Museum.

== Figurehead ==
The figurehead of Black Eagle depicts a black eagle with gold beak, talons and wing trimmings. It is also decorated with a red and gold crown on the breast.

Evidence suggests that the original figurehead, carved to suit its former name of Firebrand, was carved by George Faldo of London, with an estimated cost of £24 12s 8d (approximately £2,091 today).

In an exchange of letters in 1846, the admiral-superintendent at Portsmouth invited James Hellyer of Hellyer & Sons to propose a new figurehead for Black Eagle following her rebuild.

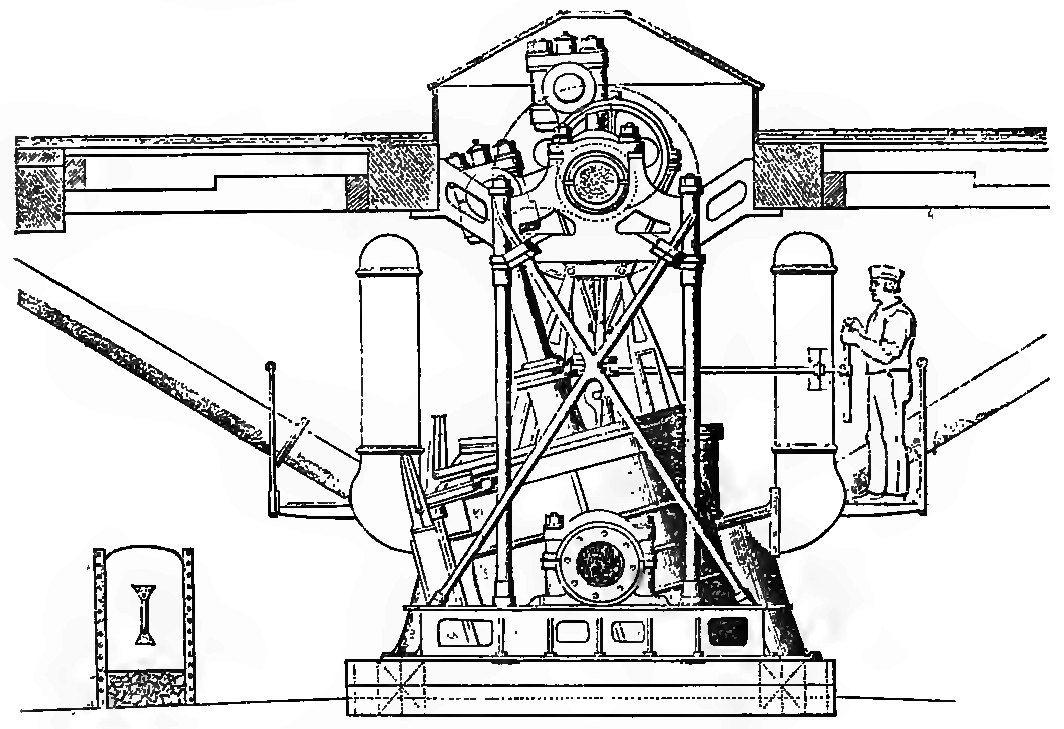
Engines of the Black Eagle

The new ship honoured the Prussian royal family who frequently cruised in her; King Frederick I of Prussia was the maternal cousin of King William III and supplier of troops to support the British effort during the War of the Spanish Succession. The black eagle became the symbol of a united Germany and featured on the Order of the Black Eagle military medal; the highest Prussian Order of chivalry. The eagle that sits centrally within the medal's design is similar in appearance to Hellyer's figurehead carving.

Upon the ship's breaking up, the figurehead stood for some time in the garden of Admiralty House in Portsmouth. It can be seen as part of the collection at the National Museum of the Royal Navy, Portsmouth.

== Bibliography ==
- Jones, Colin (1996). "Entente Cordiale, 1865". In McLean, David & Preston, Antony (eds.). Warship 1996. London: Conway Maritime Press. ISBN 0-85177-685-X.
- Lyon, David & Winfield, Rif (2004). The Sail and Steam Navy List: All the Ships of the Royal Navy 1815–1889. Chatham Publishing. ISBN 978-1-86176-032-6. OCLC 52620555.
