= Joseph Throckmorton =

American steamship captain

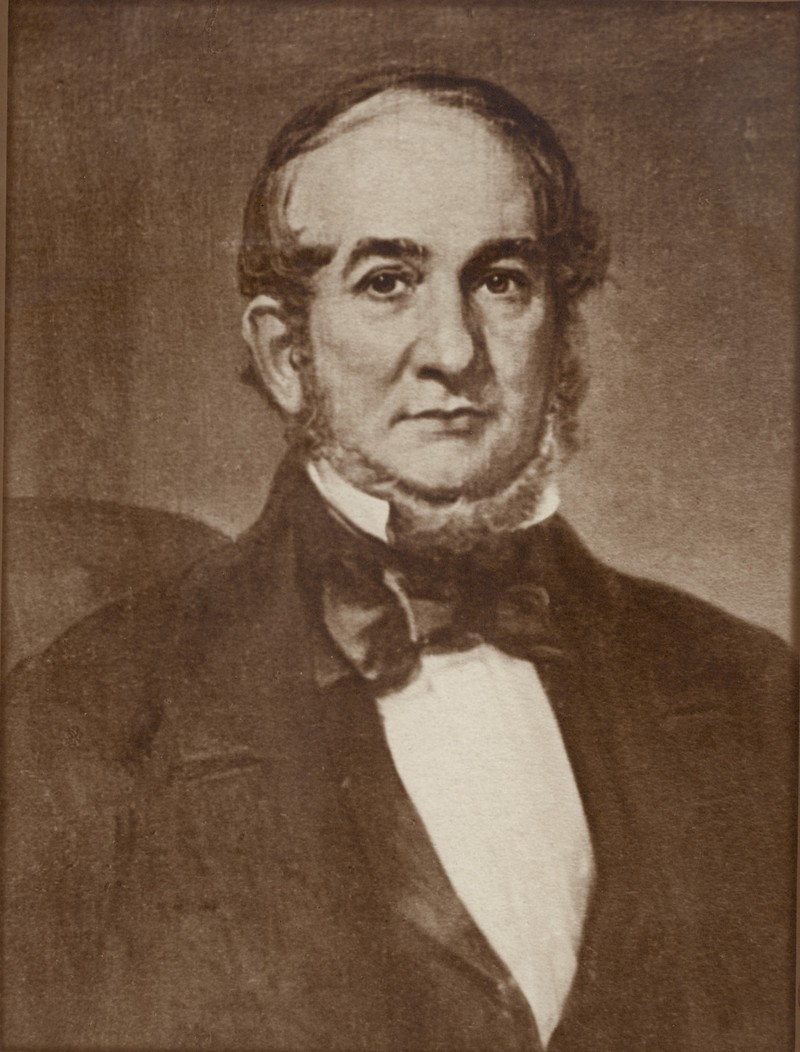
- Born: June 16, 1800; Monmouth County, New Jersey
- Died: December 1872
- Occupation(s): Steamboat captain and builder
- Known for: Steamboat captain
- Title: Captain

Joseph Throckmorton (June 16, 1800 – December 1872) was an American steamboat builder and captain during the 19th century. He was born in Monmouth County, New Jersey, and first worked in a mercantile business. His first steamboat was Red Rover, purchased on the Ohio River around 1830. In 1832 he built and skippered the steamboat Warrior. The vessel and Captain Throckmorton played a key role in the decisive battle of the 1832 Black Hawk War. Following the war, he built and owned several more steamboats, and worked for a short time as an insurance representative in St. Louis. Throckmorton died in December 1872 while employed by the United States government.

== Early life ==
Joseph Throckmorton was born on June 16, 1800, in Monmouth County, New Jersey. As a young man he was employed by a mercantile business in New York.

== Steamboat career ==
=== Early career ===
Throckmorton bought one of his first steamboats, the Red Rover, on the Ohio River. Though the boat sank, it was raised, transported to St. Louis and put into service on the Galena to St. Louis trade route around 1830. The same year Throckmorton and George W. Atchison built the steamer Winnebago which went into service along the same Galena to St. Louis route until around 1832. As his career progressed, Throckmorton became a familiar name along the Upper Mississippi River. In 1832 Throckmorton built the steamboat Warrior in Pittsburgh.

The 111-foot (33.8 m) Warrior was owned by Throckmorton in a partnership with Galena, Illinois, resident William Hempstead. It was launched in Pittsburgh during the summer of 1832 with Captain Throckmorton at the helm. The side wheeled steamboat had no cabin or accommodations for passengers but towed behind it a barge meant for passengers. At the time, the Black Hawk War had erupted between the white settlers militia and the Sauk and Meskwaki aligned under Sauk war chief Black Hawk. Throckmorton brought the new boat and its barge to St. Louis and then set out for the war zone by mid-summer 1832. The steamboat and Throckmorton would play a key role in the war's final engagement, the Battle of Bad Axe.

=== Black Hawk War ===
While returning from a mission meant to gain the alliance of Sioux warriors on August 1, Throckmorton and his Warrior came across the remnants of Black Hawk's British Band attempting to cross the Mississippi River and flee the pursuing militia force. Waving a white flag, Black Hawk tried to surrender, but as had happened in the past the soldiers failed to understand and the scene deteriorated into battle. The warriors who survived the initial volley found cover, returned fire and a two-hour firefight ensued. The Warrior eventually withdrew from battle, due to lack of fuel, and returned to Fort Crawford at Prairie du Chien.

Throckmorton returned after obtaining more wood in Prairie du Chien, leaving the refueling point about midnight and arriving at Bad Axe about 10 a.m. The battle had already commenced when the steamboat arrived and it joined in on a slaughter that lasted the next eight hours. Following the battle, Throckmorton's vessel carried Henry Atkinson and his staff to Fort Crawford where they met with Zachary Taylor, and after a short trip General Winfield Scott.

Throckmorton's actions were heavily criticized in later histories, Perry A. Armstrong singled him out as the "second Nero or Calligula [sic]" for his actions at the Battle of Bad Axe. The battle itself has often been referred to as a massacre. For his part, Throckmorton admitted that he was suspicious of the motives of the Native Americans on the shore of the river before the battle, and that he indeed knew they were of Black Hawk's band. Throckmorton's suspicions were shared by most of those on board the Warrior.

=== After the war ===
Following the Black Hawk War, which ended with the decisive battle at Bad Axe, Throckmorton remained active as a steamboater on the Upper Mississippi River. During the 1830s the Warrior was one of about 12 boats that carried large amounts of supplies, mostly food and clothing, to Fort Snelling, Minnesota. The steamboat's crew in 1835, during which they made two documented stops at Snelling, still included Captain Throckmorton, as well as clerk E.H. Gleim, and pilot William White. Also in 1835, Throckmorton built another steamboat, the St. Peter. More steamboat construction would follow, in 1836 he built Ariel, in 1837 Burlington and in 1842 the General Brooke. In 1845 he sold the Brooke to the American Fur Company and was given command of the company's steamer, Nimrod. He commanded Nimrod until 1848 when he purchased the Cora, a vessel he was at the helm of until about 1850 when he left steamboating for a brief career in insurance.

== Late life and death ==
Throckmorton worked as an insurance representative for a Tennessee company in St. Louis for a period of at least "several years." After the stint in insurance, Throckmorton returned to his former occupation as a steamboater, but with less success than he experienced before. Upon his return he built the steamboat Genoa and commanded it as captain until 1856. Throckmorton built at least two more steamboats during his lifetime, in 1857 the Florence and in 1864 the Montana. In 1868 he purchased another steamboat, the Columbia, and ran that boat on the St. Louis to Fort Benton trade route, eventually making trips along the Illinois trade route with the boat. He sold the Columbia to the Arkansas River Packet Company and worked for the United States government from 1870–72, the last two years of his life. Throckmorton died at the age of 72 in December 1872.
