= HMS Dee (1832) =

Sloop of the Royal Navy

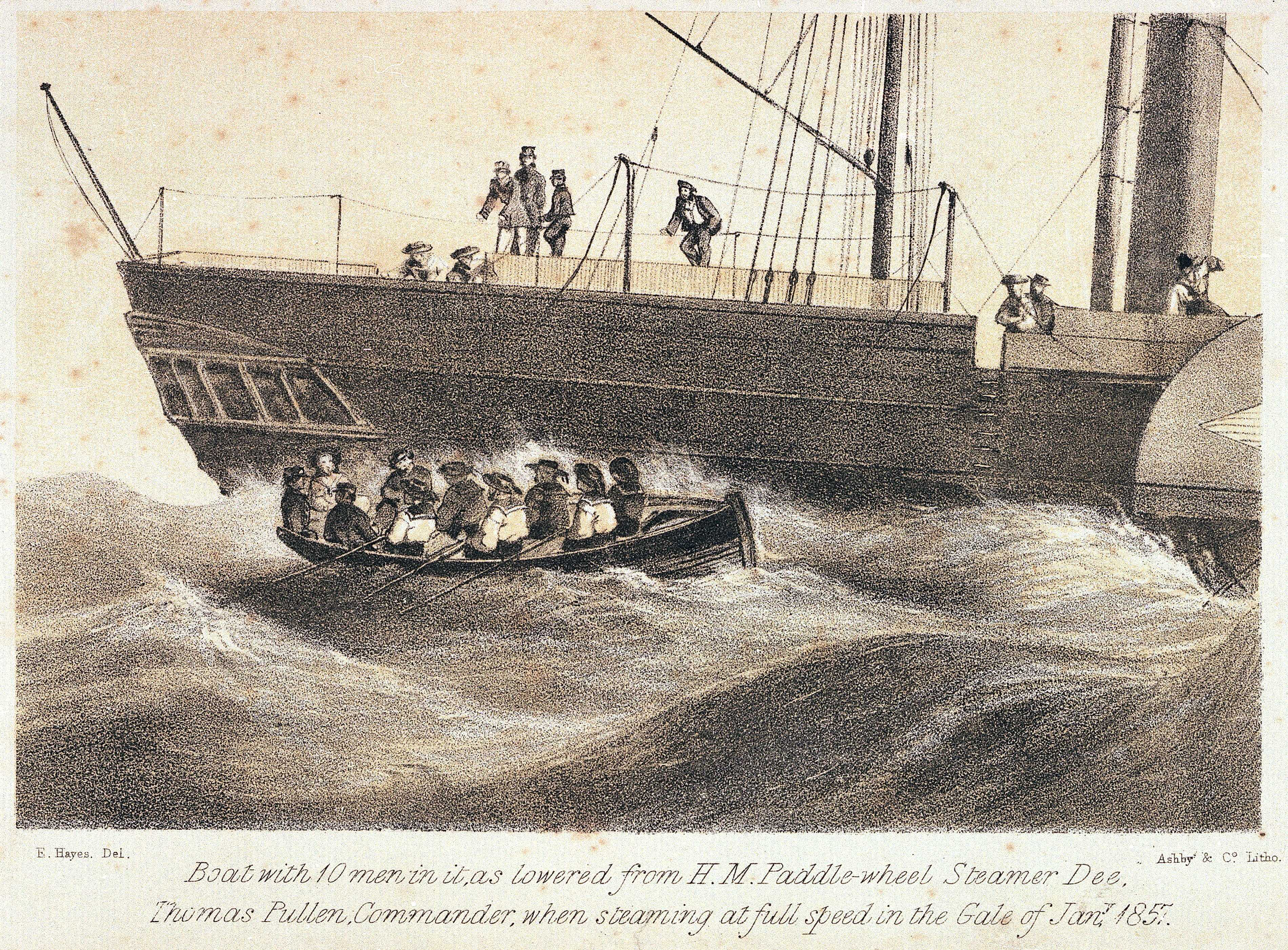
- Dee, Thomas Pullen, Commander, when steaming at full speed in the gale of January 1857

History

United Kingdom
- Name: Dee
- Ordered: 4 April 1827
- Builder: Woolwich Dockyard
- Cost: £19,275 including fitting, £11,261 for machinery
- Laid down: October 1829
- Launched: 5 April 1832
- Completed: 26 August 1832
- Commissioned: 9 June 1832
- Decommissioned: 17 June 1871
- Fate: Broken up at Sheerness 1871

General characteristics
- Type: Steam vessel
- Displacement: 907 long tons (922 t)
- Tons burthen: 704 (bm)
- Length: 166 ft 7 in (50.8 m) gundeck; 146 ft 6 in (44.7 m) keel for tonnage
- Beam: 30 ft 4.5 in (9.3 m) maximum; 30 ft 0.5 in (9.2 m) reported for tonnage
- Draught: 11 ft 6 in (3.5 m) (forward and aft)
- Depth of hold: 16 ft 4 in (5.0 m)
- Installed power: Maudslay, Sons and Field, 2-cylinder side-lever 200 nhp, 272 ihp (203 kW)
- Propulsion: Side-paddles
- Sail plan: Brigantine rig
- Speed: 8 knots (15 km/h; 9.2 mph)
- Armament: Initially 2 × 18 pdr (22 cwt) guns; later 6 × 32 pdr (4 × 63 cwt and 2 × 56 cwt) guns all on pivot mounts; 1 × 10-inch 86 cwt shell gun (replace 2 × 56 cwt MLSB guns)

HMS Dee was the first paddle steamer ordered for the Royal Navy, designed to carry a significant armament. She was ordered on 4 April 1827 from Woolwich Dockyard. She was designed by Sir Robert Seppings, Surveyor of the Navy and modified by Oliver Lang. This vessel was considered as new construction as a previous vessel ordered as a flush deck Cherokee-class brig in 1824, had been renamed African in May 1825. She was initially classed as a steam vessel (SV), and in 1837 reclassified as a steam vessel class 2 (SV2). She was converted to a troopship in May 1842 and as a second class sloop in 1846. She was converted into a storeship in 1868. She was broken at Sheerness in 1871.

Dee was the third ship to carry this name since it was introduced for a 20-gun sixth rate, launched by Bailey of Ipswich on 5 May 1814 and sold on 33 July 1819 to Pitman.

== Design and specifications ==
Her keel was laid in October 1829 at Woolwich Dockyard and launched on 5 April 1832. The gundeck was 166 feet 7 inches (50.77 metres) in length with 146 feet 6 inches (44.65 metres) reported for tonnage calculation. Her maximum breadth was 30 feet 4.5 inches (9.26 metres) with 30 feet 0.5 inches (9.16 metres) reported for tonnage calculation. Her depth of hold was 16 feet 4 inches (4.98 metres). Her draught both fore and aft was 11 feet 6 inches (3.51 metres). Her builder's measure for tonnage was 704 tons with a displacement of 907 tons.

Her machinery was supplied by Maudslay, Son and Field of Lambeth. She shipped two rectangular fire-tube boilers. The steam engine was a vertical single expansion (VSE) side lever engine with cylinders of 54 inches (1,371.60 millimetres) with a stroke of 60 inches (1,524.00 millimetres), rated at 200 nominal horsepower (nhp). The engines were connected to two 20 feet (6.10 metres) diameter paddle wheels. Steam was produced and delivered to the engines from tubular boilers at 3.5 pounds per square inch (0.24 atm; 24 kPa) above atmospheric pressure. The Science Museum, London has a model of Dee's engine. When the paddle wheels turned 18 revolutions per minute, she had a maximum speed of 8 knots (15 km/h; 9.2 mph). In 1856, Dee and the yacht Black Eagle were used in a trial of J Wethered's apparatus for superheated steam. This produced an economy of fuel of 18% in Black Eagle, and 31% in Dee. In 1866, she was given a new 220 nominal horsepower engine.

Her initial armament consisted of two 18-pounder 22 hundredweight (cwt) muzzle loading smooth bore (MLSB) guns on pivot mounts. Her armament was soon changed to six 32-pounder MLSB guns all on pivot mounts. The six guns were a combination of four 63 cwt and two 56 cwt guns. Late in her career the 56 cwt guns were replaced with a single 10-inch 86 cwt shell gun. In 1868 when converted to a storeship, her armament was removed.

== Commissioned service ==
=== First commission ===
HMS Dee initial commission was on 9 June 1832 under the command of Commander Robert Oliver, RN for service with the squadron blockading the Dutch coast from 9 June 1832 – 27 May 1834, when the steamers Dee and Rhadamanthus were part of a Royal Navy force including three line-of-battle ships and ten other sailing ships that blockaded the Dutch ports in 1832. This was in support of the French Army, which had intervened in the Belgian Revolution in support of the Belgians against the Dutch, and intervened again to besiege the Dutch garrison of Antwerp. "The two steamers had been particularly useful in the narrow channels of the Dutch estuaries with their fast tidal currents." With the end of the Dutch blockade she was assigned to the Home Station under the command of Commander Edward Stanley, RN on 5 November 1833. On 29 May 1854 she was assigned to the North America and West Indies station under the command of Commander William Ramsay, RN. She returned to Home Waters, paying off in April 1837.

=== Second commission ===
Her second commission started in February 1838 under the command of Commander Joseph Shearer, RN for service on south-east coast of America. She returned to Home Waters paying off in May 1841.

=== Conversion to transport ===
In December 1841 she was taken in hand at Sheerness for conversion to a troop transport. The first phase was completed in June 1842 at a cost of £6,939. She was recommissioned under the command of Thomas Driver, Master on 26 May 1842. She underwent the second phase at Woolwich from June to September 1842 at a cost of £5,461. In March 1846 the Dee was engaged bringing food supplies to Sligo as relief following the first failed harvest of the Great Irish Famine. On 18 May 1848 she was under the command of George Filmer, Master for service at the Cape of Good Hope Station. On 14 September 1852 she was under the command of Lieutenant George T.C. Smith, RN remaining at the Cape of Good Hope Station. She returned to Home Waters in mid-1854.

=== Conversion to storeship ===
Between November and December 1854 she was converted to a storeship at Portsmouth at a cost of £860.

She was recommissioned on 23 November 1854 under the command of Thomas C. Pullen, Master. At the time of the 1861 Census, she was in Plymouth Sound, under Pullen's command, en-route between the Clyde and Chatham, carrying Marines and family members, one as young as 1 month.

She paid off in 1860. On 12 June 1863 she was commissioned under the command of George Raymond, Master as a storeship. On 14 October 1869, George Waters, Master took command at Woolwich.

== Disposition ==
She was paid off for the last time on 17 June 1871 at Sheerness. She was broken at Sheerness in October 1871.
