= HMS Imogene (1831) =

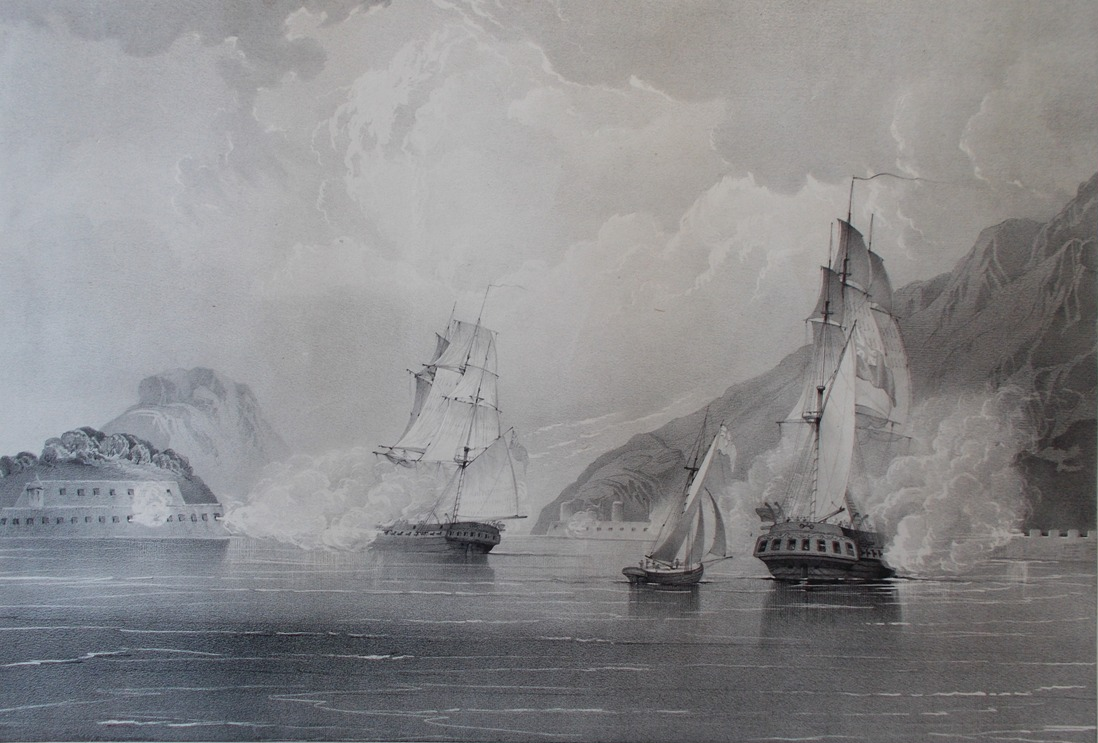
- HMS Imogene (left) engaging the Bogue forts in China, September 1834

History

United Kingdom
- Name: Imogene
- Ordered: 9 June 1825
- Builder: Pembroke Dockyard
- Laid down: November 1829
- Launched: 24 June 1831
- Commissioned: 1 October 1831
- Fate: Accidentally burnt at Plymouth, 27 September 1840

General characteristics
- Class & type: Conway-class corvette
- Tons burthen: 651 74/94 bm
- Length: 125 ft (38.1 m) (gundeck); 106 ft (32.3 m) (keel)
- Beam: 34 ft 5 in (10.5 m)
- Depth: 10 ft (3.0 m)
- Sail plan: Full-rigged ship
- Complement: 175
- Armament: Upper deck: 20 × 32-pounder carronades; Quarterdeck: 6 × 18-pounder carronades; Focsle: 2 × 9-pounder cannon

HMS Imogene was a Conway-class sixth rate of the Royal Navy, built by Pembroke Dockyard and launched on 24 June 1831. She served in the East Indies, China and South America, but was accidentally burnt while out of commission on 27 September 1840.

== Design and construction ==
Designed by Sir Robert Seppings in 1828, the Conway class were a broader version of HMS Tyne of 1826. They were intended as sixth rates, which placed them in a category of ships with more than 24 but less than 36 guns, and commanded by an officer of the rank of captain.

These ships were constructed of wood in traditional shipbuilding fashion, although iron braces and trussed were used for increased longitudinal strength. They were armed with a traditional arrangement of broadside, smoothbore muzzle-loading guns, and in common with contemporary Royal Navy practice for small ships, these guns were carronades (with the exception of a pair of small long guns on the focsle as chasers). Twenty 32-pounder carronades were mounted on the upper deck and a further six 18-pounder carronades were placed on the quarterdeck. The sail plan was an entirely conventional ship rig, and they were complemented with 175 men and boys.

== Operational service ==
After commissioning on 1 October 1831 for the East Indies, she sailed via the Cape of Good Hope for Calcutta. In October 1832 she sailed from Madras for a cruise to New South Wales, visiting the Swan River, Hobart and Sydney. In May 1833 she delivered James Busby, the British Resident to the Bay of Islands, New Zealand, and arriving back in India on 11 October 1833. Between November 1833 and August 1834 she visited Ceylon, Mauritius, Malacca and Singapore before being sent to China. Under the command of Captain Price Blackwood she was in action against the Bogue forts at the mouth of the Pearl River on 7 September 1834 in company with Andromache and Louisa. Although five ports, including Canton, had been opened to foreigners earlier the same year, local Chinese forces tried to prevent the passage of the Royal Navy ships. After a couple of days of intermittent action the Chinese forts were silenced at the cost of 2 killed and 7 wounded, and after local officials had disavowed the military action, the ships proceeded to Whampoa.

Returning to England via Manilla and the Cape of Good Hope in 1834 and 1835, she was recommissioned at Portsmouth on 11 June 1836. From June 1836 until December 1839 she served on the south-east coast of America under the command of Captain (later Admiral) Henry William Bruce. She was out of commission at Plymouth from January 1840.

== Fate ==
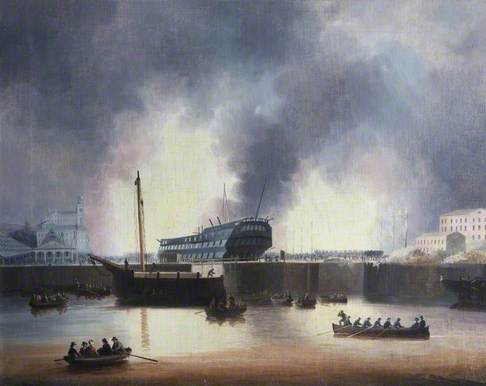
The Fire on the morning of 27 September, which destroyed Talavera and Imogene threatened to destroy Devonport dockyard

Imogene was accidentally burnt at Plymouth on 27 September 1840 while in ordinary. Devonport dockyard was the scene of large scale fire which started in the North Dock. Talavera and Imogene were completely gutted, the fire spread to HMS Minden whose fire was successfully put out, and to nearby buildings and equipment. Estimates for the damage were put at £150,000 in then money, and would have totalled £500,000 had the fire not been contained.
