= USS Sylph (1831) =

History

United States
- Name: USS Sylph
- Builder: Dorgin and Baily, Fells Point, Baltimore, Maryland
- Launched: 1831
- Commissioned: 19 May 1831
- In service: 3 June 1831
- Fate: Foundered August 1831

General characteristics
- Tons burthen: 44 (bm)
- Sail plan: Schooner
- Complement: 13
- Armament: 1 gun

USS Sylph was a schooner launched in 1831 at Baltimore as the mercantile Sarah Ann. The Navy purchased her in April 1831 and renamed her Sylph on 26 April 1831. She underwent fitting out at the Washington Navy Yard and was commissioned there on 19 May 1831 under the command of Lieutenant H. E. V. Robinson.

Sylph was reported ready for sea on 3 June. On that day or shortly thereafter she sailed for Norfolk in company with the schooners USS Shark and Fourth of July. The three schooners were under orders to patrol the coasts of the southern states to protect southern live oak growing on public lands. (Live oak was then used extensively in shipbuilding.)

Sylph left Norfolk and sailed to Pensacola. Her station was District 7, i.e., the Gulf Coast from the Perdido River (just west of Pensacola), to the mouth of the Sabine River.

In July 1831 Sylph sailed on her first patrol from Pensacola and was never heard from again. A vessel reported that during a strong storm near the mouth of the Mississippi she had sighted a ship in distress that was believed to have been Sylph. lost with all 13 crew.
