= Sun (1832 ship) =

History

United Kingdom
- Name: Sun
- Builder: Sunderland
- Launched: 1832
- Fate: Abandoned at sea 1836

General characteristics
- Tons burthen: 244 (bm)
- Sail plan: Snow

Sun was launched at Sunderland in 1832 and was lost in 1836.

Sun first appeared in Lloyd's Register (LR) in 1834.

Year	Master	Owner	Trade	Source
1833	H.Potter	White & Co.	Sunderland–London	Register of Shipping
1834	A.Leckie; R.Soulsby	H.Panton	Shields–London	LR
1836	J.Harrison	H.Panton	Newcastle–Quebec	LR

Her crew abandoned Sun on 20 July 1836 off Cape Sable Island, Nova Scotia. She was on a voyage from Quebec City to Gloucester. Her entry in the LR volume for 1836 carried the annotation "Abandoned" underneath her name.
