= Conway-class corvette =

Royal Navy ship class

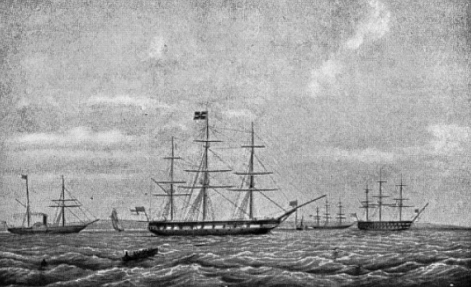
- HMS Conway

Class overview
- Builders: Chatham Dockyard; Pembroke Dockyard; Deptford Dockyard
- Operators: Royal Navy
- Built: 1829–1832
- In commission: 1831–1870
- Completed: 2
- Canceled: 1
- Lost: 1
- Scrapped: 1

General characteristics
- Class & type: Corvette (initially classed as sixth rate)
- Tons burthen: 651 74/94 bm
- Length: 125 ft (38 m) (gundeck); 106 ft (32 m) (keel)
- Beam: 34 ft 5 in (10.49 m)
- Depth: 10 ft (3.0 m)
- Sail plan: Full-rigged ship
- Complement: 175
- Armament: Upper deck: 20 × 32-pounder carronades; Quarterdeck: 6 × 18-pounder carronades; Focsle: 2 × 9-pounder cannon

The Conway-class sixth rates (later re-designated as Conway-class corvettes) were a class of three 28-gun ships built for the Royal Navy in the early 1830s. Alarm was cancelled in 1832 and Imogene accidentally burnt in 1840, leaving the sole survivor of the class, Conway, to survive until 1871.

== Design and construction ==
Designed by Sir Robert Seppings in 1828, the Conway class were a broader version of HMS Tyne of 1826. They were intended as sixth rates, which placed them in a category of ships with more than 24 but less than 36 guns, and commanded by an officer of the rank of captain.

These ships were constructed of wood in traditional shipbuilding fashion, although iron braces and trusses were used for increased longitudinal strength. They were armed with a traditional arrangement of broadside, smoothbore muzzle-loading guns, and in common with contemporary Royal Navy practice for small ships, these guns were carronades (with the exception of a pair of small long guns on the focsle as chasers). Twenty 32-pounder carronades were mounted on the upper deck and a further six 18-pounder carronades were placed on the quarterdeck. The sail plan was an entirely conventional ship rig, and they were complemented with 175 men and boys.

== Operational lives ==
=== HMS Imogene ===
Imogene was commissioned in 1831 for the East Indies. She travelled as far as New South Wales and saw action in China in 1834 against the Bogue forts. She returned to England in 1835 and was recommissioned for the South America station in 1836. In 1840 she was placed in reserve and was destroyed by fire on 27 September 1840.

=== HMS Conway ===
Conway was commissioned in 1832 for the North Sea, Lisbon, and South America. She recommissioned in 1835 for the Pacific, and during this time she carried some of Charles Darwin's letters and specimens back to the United Kingdom. She paid off in 1835, recommissioning the next year for the East Indies. This commission saw her travel as far as Australia and New Zealand, and during this time she saw action in the First Opium War, including the capture of Chusan. In 1842 she carried home the United Kingdom's share of the $6,000,000 indemnity paid by the Chinese at the end of the war. From 1843 to 1847 she served on the Cape of Good Hope Station. There was a long break until her next commission, which was from 1854 to 1858 at Queenstown, Ireland (now Cobh in County Cork). She was lent to the Mercantile Marine Association of Liverpool in February 1859 to act as a training ship for boys, and gave her name to HMS Conway, a series of ships and a shore-based school. When Winchester took her place as the training ship in 1861, the two ships swapped names. Under her new name of Winchester she became the Aberdeen Royal Naval Reserve ship on 28 August 1861. She was broken up in 1871.

== Ships ==
All three ships of the class were ordered on 9 June 1825.

Name	Ship Builder	Laid down	Launched	Fate
Imogene	Pembroke Dockyard	November 1829	24 June 1831	Accidentally burnt at Plymouth on 27 September 1840
Conway	Chatham Dockyard	December 1829	2 February 1832	Lent as training ship in February 1859 to the Mercantile Marine Association, renamed Winchester and transferred to Aberdeen Royal Naval Reserve on 28 August 1861. Broken up at Sheerness in 1871
Alarm	Deptford Dockyard	November 1826 (Note: She was transferred to Pembroke Dockyard and laid down again in January 1832)	Cancelled before launch	Cancelled on 14 September 1832, when the frame was nearly complete. Broken up later the same year
