= Woodlark (1819 ship) =

History

United Kingdom
- Name: Woodlark
- Namesake: Woodlark
- Builder: James Warwick, Rotherhithe
- Launched: 7 August 1819
- Fate: Wrecked 18 April 1828

General characteristics
- Tons burthen: 196, or 19654/94 (bm)
- Sail plan: Schooner, later brig
- Notes: Built of oak and fir

Woodlark was launched at Rotherhithe in 1819. She initially traded with the Mediterranean but then switched to trading with Australia, the Dutch East Indies, and Singapore. She was wrecked in April 1828 while sailing from Australia to the Cape of Good Hope (CGH, or "the Cape") on her way to England.

== Career ==
Woodlark entered Lloyd's Register (LR) in 1819 with Middleton, master, Middleton, owner, and trade London–Trieste. She also sailed to Buenos Aires, from where she returned to London on 21 April 1822. In 1823 her master changed from Turnbull to J. Brown, and her trade was London–CGH.

In 1813 the British East India Company (EIC) had lost its monopoly on the trade between India and Britain. British ships were then free to sail East of the Cape of Good Hope to Australia, the Indian Ocean, or India under a license from the EIC. A list of licensed vessels trading with Australia showed Woodlark, T. Brown, master, Buckles, owner, sailing to New South Wales on 9 March 1823. On 20 March 1824 she sailed to Singapore.

On 17 August 1827 Woodlark, A. Leary, master, sailed to New South Wales.

== Fate ==
Woodlark, Leary, master, left Sydney on 29 March 1828 and arrived at Hobart Town on 13 March. Captain G.A. Leary (Lieutenant (RN rtd.)), left Hobart Town on 24 March, bound for the Cape and London. He ran into adverse weather off south west Tasmania and decide to sail via the Torres Straits. She bore up for Torres Straits when on 18 April she struck an unmarked shoal sixty miles from Wreck Reef. (Leary's last location calculation some hours before she struck put her at 21°54′S 153°53′E, just east of the Saumarez Reefs. After repairing the ship's longboat and constructing a raft, the crew sailed towards the coast, some 200 miles to their east. On 14 May the 18 men in the longboat reached Moreton Bay in a state of near starvation. The six men on the raft were not seen again.

Lloyd's List reported on 2 December 1828 that Captain Leary and his crew had arrived in Sydney. Three days later it passed on an earlier report that the crew had been saved and had arrived at Moreton Bay.
