= Water Witch (schooner) =

Coordinates: 44°14′00″N 73°20′05″W

Water Witch was constructed originally as a steamboat in Otter Creek, Vermont in 1832. In 1835, the Lake Champlain Transportation Company bought her and converted her into a schooner. Piloted by Captain Thomas Mock, who had on board his wife and three children and overloaded with iron ore, Water Witch sank in Lake Champlain during a storm on April 26, 1866. The Mocks′ infant, Roa, was in the cabin, and was lost.

The wreck of Water Witch was discovered in 1977 by Derek Grout, a Canadian diver. It is considered one of the oldest fully intact commercial sailing ships located underwater in the United States The schooner lies on the bottom of Lake Champlain between New York and Vermont. The vessel is historically significant for its history and construction. The location of Water Witch is an archaeological grave site preserved by the Underwater Historic Preserve System.
