= HMS Cockatrice (1832) =

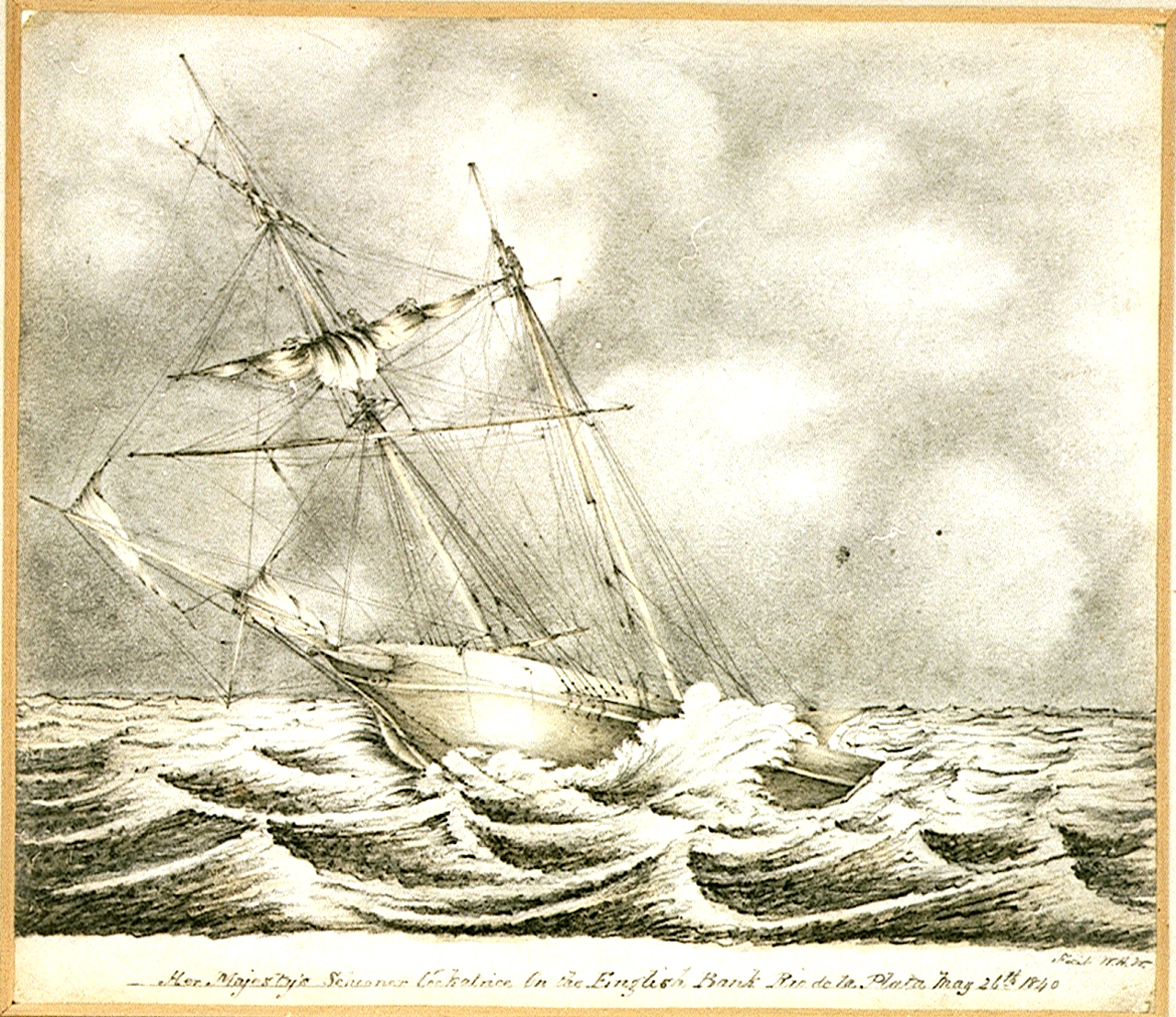
- Her Majesty's schooner Cockatrice On the English Bank, Rio de la Plata May 26th 1840

History

United Kingdom
- Name: Cockatrice
- Namesake: Cockatrice
- Ordered: 11 September 1828
- Builder: Pembroke Dockyard
- Laid down: July 1831
- Launched: 14 May 1832
- Completed: 15 September 1832
- Reclassified: As packet boat, 1832
- Fate: Sold, September 1858

General characteristics
- Class & type: Cockatrice-class schooner
- Tons burthen: 18178/94 bm
- Length: 80 ft (24.4 m) (gundeck); 64 ft 2 in (19.6 m) (keel)
- Beam: 23 ft 4 in (7.1 m)
- Draught: 9 ft 5 in (2.9 m)
- Depth: 9 ft 10 in (3.0 m)
- Sail plan: brigantine rig
- Complement: 33–42
- Armament: 2 × 6-pdr cannon; 4 × 12-pdr carronades

HMS Cockatrice was a six-gun schooner, the name ship of her class, built for the Royal Navy during the 1830s. She was sold for scrap in 1858.

== Description ==
Cockatrice had a length at the gundeck of 80 feet (24.4 m) and 64 feet 2 inches (19.6 m) at the keel. She had a beam of 23 feet 4 inches (7.1 m), a draught of about 9 feet 5 inches (2.9 m) and a depth of hold of 9 feet 10 inches (3.0 m). The ship's tonnage was 181 78/94 tons burthen. The Cockatrice class was armed with two 6-pounder cannon and four 12-pounder carronades. The ships had a crew of 33–42 officers and ratings.

== Construction and career ==
Cockatrice, the second ship of her name to serve in the Royal Navy, was ordered on 11 September 1828, laid down in July 1831 at Pembroke Dockyard, Wales, and launched on 14 May 1832. She was completed on 15 September 1832 at Plymouth Dockyard.
