= Woodlark (1832 ship) =

History

United Kingdom
- Name: Woodlark
- Namesake: Woodlark
- Builder: Moulmain, Burma. or Amherst, Temasserim, Burma
- Launched: 1832
- Fate: Last mentioned 1890–1891

General characteristics
- Tons burthen: Old Act:250 (bm); New Act (post 1836): 237 (bm))
- Length: 90 ft 5 in (27.6 m)
- Beam: 25 ft 4 in (7.7 m)
- Depth: 18 ft 0 in (5.5 m)
- Sail plan: Barque

Woodlark was launched at Moulmain in 1832. Circa 1835 she sailed to London and transferred to British registry. Between 1836 and 1844 she made two whaling voyages. In 1848 she transferred her ownership and registry to Sydney, from where she continued to sail for some time. She briefly appeared and was last listed as being in New Zealand in 1890–1891.

== Career ==
In 1832 Woodlark, Tozer, master, was reported to have arrived from Moulmain. In 1834 Woodlark, Tozer, master, was reported to have arrived at Madras from Moulmain. In 1835 Tozer and Woodlark were reported to have arrived from China and Singapore.

By one account, Woodlark was lost in 1836 while sailing from Mauritius.

However, Woodlark, apparently had changed her registry. Woodlark of 237 tons (bm) and built in India in 1832, entered Lloyd's Register in 1836 with Hardy, master, Crighton, owner, and trade London–South Seas. Two whaling voyages followed.

1st whaling voyage (1836–1840): Captain William Hardie (or Hardy), sailed from England on 28 July 1836, bound for Timor. Woodlark sailed via Brava, Cape Verde, to the Bay of Islands, New Zealand. She then sailed north to Timor. She was at various times reported at Battogada, Goram, and in the Timor strait. She returned to London on 3 April 1840 with 1800 barrels of whale oil.

2nd whaling voyage (1840–1844): Captain Hardy sailed from London on 24 June 1840, bound for Timor. Woodlark sailed via Santiago, Cape Verde, and was reported at Copang, Bali, and the waters around Timor.

On 22 May 1843 Woodlark was in the waters near Copang and in company with two other whalers, Alert, Captain Martinson, and Pilot, Captain Blake. At the same time Sarah and Elizabeth, Captain H. Billinghurst, anchored at Coffins Bay, an uninhabited bay a few miles SSE of Copang, to gather water and firewood. Billinghurst sent a party ashore that quickly came under attack from pirate proas that suddenly appeared. When he saw several hundred locals coming towards Sarah and Elizabeth in large proas, he put his crew in the whaleboats. He was able to retrieve some of the shore party. He discovered that three had been killed and the rest had disappeared. The British then rowed away. Within a few miles they saw and reached Woodlark. Hardie took them onboard and passed on the news to Martinson and Blake. The whalers from all four ships formed a rescue party with as many men as they could safely muster and rowed towards Sarah and Elizabeth. As they approached they saw that she was on fire. The fire reached her magazine, which exploded before they reached her. Sarah and Elizabeth was a complete wreck. The rescue party then went to see if they could find any more survivors from the shore party but there was no one to be found. The whalers took Billinghurst and his crew to Copang where they found the survivors, who had walked there.

Woodlark returned to London on 10 June 1844 with 121 tuns of oil.

On her return her master changed to Clarkson. LR for 1845 showed her with Clarkson, master, Crighton, owner, and trade London-Mauritius, changing to London–Sydney.

Year	Master	Owner	Trade	Source & notes
1849				LR – Not listed
1850	Broomfield	Thacker & Co.	London–Sydney	LR; Port belonging to is listed as Sydney
1851	Broomfield	Thacker & Co.	No listing	LR; no homeport listed

In 1848-49 Woodlark changed her homeport and registry to Sydney. Thereafter reports exist of voyages, some including whaling, for "Woodlark, barque of Sydney, ...237 tons".

== Fate ==
Woodlark appeared for one year only in LR for 1890/91. She was described as a wood brig of 259 NRT, built in India. Her origin was listed as "Volman Amhirston, E.I.". Her owner was the Union Steam Ship Company of New Zealand, based in Dunedin.
